= David S. Wishart =

Canadian bioinformatician (born 1961)

David Wishart FRSC
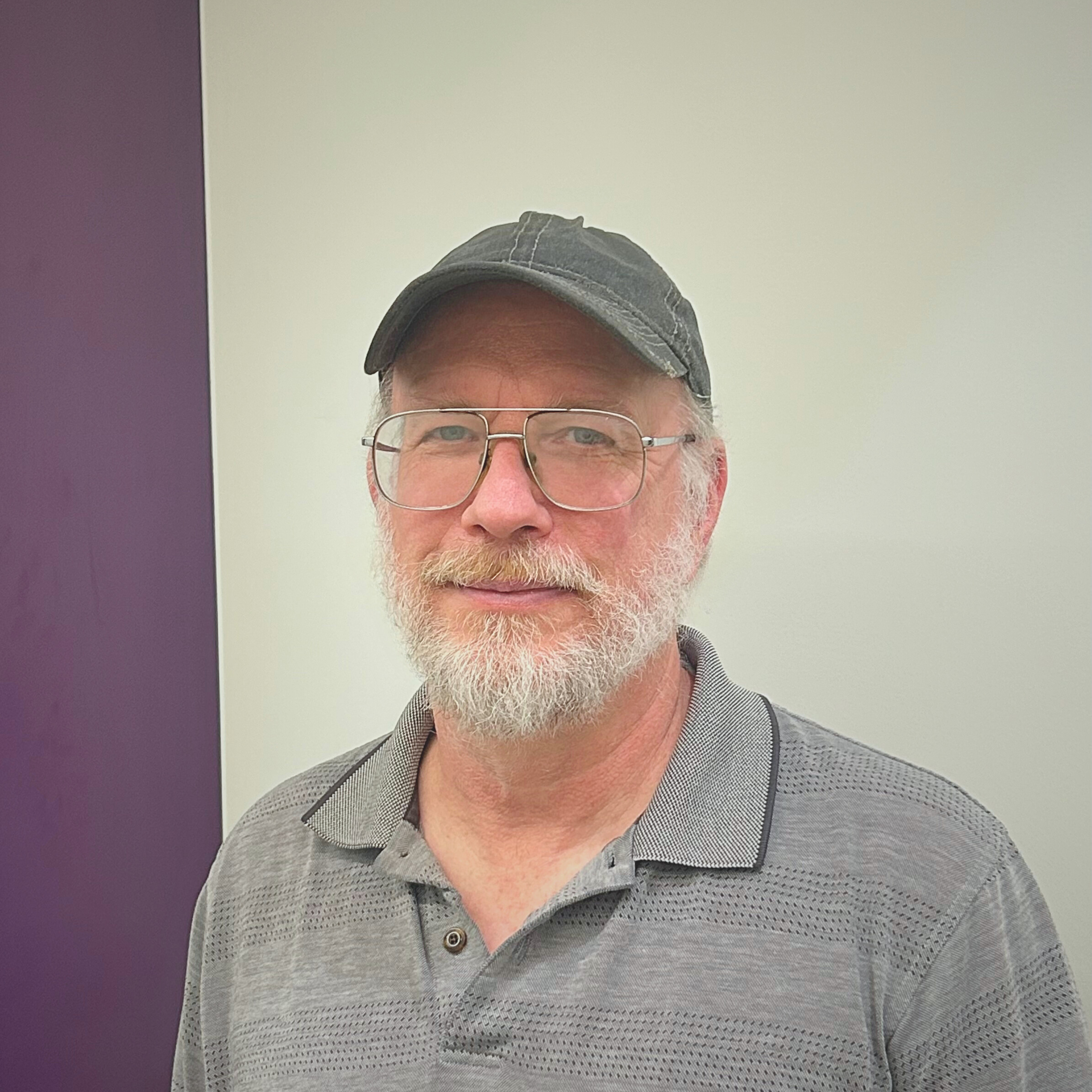
- Born: December 7, 1961 (age 64); Edmonton, Alberta, Canada
- Education: University of Alberta; Yale University
- Occupation: Professor
- Known for: HMDB; DrugBank; MetaboAnalyst; FooDB
- Awards: 1. Governor General’s Innovation Award (2026); 2. ASTech Award for AI/ML and Quantum Computing (2025); 3. University Cup (University of Alberta) (2025); 4. The Gerard Herzberg Gold Medal Award (2025); 5. Brockhouse Canada Prize for Interdisciplinary Research in Science and Engineering (2024); 6. Canadian Research Chair Tier 1 (2023); 7. J. Gordin Kaplan Award for Excellence in Research (2023); 8. Distinguished University Professor (2018); 9. Fellow of the Royal Society of Canada (2017); 10. University of Alberta Alumni Award (2017); 11. ASTech Awards (1999, 2021); 12. Lifetime Fellowship, Metabolomics Society (2014)
- Scientific career
- Fields: Metabolomics; Bioinformatics; Cheminformatics; Structural Biology
- Workplaces: University of Alberta
- Website: www.wishartlab.com, www.tmicwishartnode.ca

David S. Wishart FRSC (born December 7, 1961), a Canadian researcher, serves as a Distinguished University Professor in both the Department of Biological Sciences and the Department of Computing Science at the University of Alberta and remains active in metabolomics, exposomics, artificial intelligence, cheminformatics, precision nutrition, and precision medicine research. Wishart also holds cross appointments in the Faculty of Pharmacy and Pharmaceutical Sciences and the Department of Laboratory Medicine and Pathology in the Faculty of Medicine and Dentistry. Additionally, Wishart holds a joint appointment in metabolomics at the Pacific Northwest National Laboratory in Richland, Washington. Wishart is well known for his pioneering contributions to the fields of protein NMR spectroscopy, bioinformatics, cheminformatics and metabolomics. In 2011, Wishart founded the Metabolomics Innovation Centre (TMIC), which is Canada's national metabolomics laboratory. In addition to establishing this national core facility, Wishart has been widely recognized for his foundational work in developing the field of metabolomics. In 2024, he received the Brockhouse Award, a prestigious Natural Sciences and Engineering Research Council of Canada (NSERC) Prize/Award recognizing outstanding teamwork in science and engineering. In 2025, Wishart received the Gerhard Herzberg Canada Gold Medal for Science and Engineering, Canada's highest science award, and the University of Alberta's University Cup. In 2026, he received a Governor General's Innovation Award for his role in creating and advancing the field of metabolomics.

Wishart is also a biotech entrepreneur. Since 1995 he has launched eight start-up biotech companies, including Chenomx, OMx Personal Health Analytics and Molecular You Corp. With more than 640 publications, a H-index of 154, and >165,000 citations over his career, he has been consistently ranked among the world's most cited scientists in any discipline and among the world's most cited 200 life scientists.

== Early life and education ==
Wishart was born and raised in Edmonton, Alberta, Canada and has one brother, Ian (a physician) and one sister, Sandy. His mother, Patricia worked as a naturalist and author; his father William was a wildlife biologist with the government of Alberta. Wishart identifies as Metis. He has both Cree and Assiniboine ancestry from his father's side and Scottish ancestry from his mother's side. As a youth, Wishart learned to hunt, fish and trap from his father, who also used to operate his own trapline.

Wishart received his B.Sc. (Honours, First Class) in physics from the University of Alberta in 1983 and his M.Phil. (1986) and Ph.D. degrees (1991) in molecular biophysics from Yale University. Wishart completed his Ph.D. under the supervision of Frederic M. Richards and his post-doctoral studies (1991–1995) under the supervision of Brian D. Sykes.

== Academic career ==
Wishart started his academic career as an assistant professor in 1995 with the Faculty of Pharmacy and Pharmaceutical Sciences at the University of Alberta where he held the Bristol Myers Squibb Chair in Biotechnology for 10 years. He was promoted to associate professor in 2002 and full professor in 2003, joining the Departments of Computing Science and Biological Sciences in the Faculty of Science at the University of Alberta. Because of his growing involvement in clinical chemistry, Wishart was appointed as an adjunct professor in the Department of Laboratory Medicine and Pathology in 2012. In 2018, Wishart was appointed as a Distinguished University Professor in both the Departments of Biological Sciences and Computing Science. From 2004-2016, Wishart also served as a senior research officer and the director of nanobiology at the National Research Council of Canada with the National Institute of Nanotechnology, located on the University of Alberta campus.

== Research ==
Wishart's research interests span a number of areas including structural biology, computational biology, bioinformatics, nanobiology, metabolomics, exposomics, nuclear magnetic resonance (NMR) spectroscopy and mass spectrometry. A common theme to his research career has been the development of techniques, technology cores, protocols, data resources or computer programs that make science simpler, faster, cheaper or easier.

=== Biomolecular NMR ===
Wishart began his research career in the field of protein NMR in the early 1990s, focusing on using NMR spectroscopy to characterize protein structure and protein denaturation. At the time, protein structural analysis by NMR required hundreds of hours of manual data analysis and data tabulation. In an effort to accelerate the process, Wishart discovered a trend with regard to how the NMR chemical shifts of amino acid residues changed systematically with regard to their secondary structure. He proceeded to develop a technique, called the chemical shift index, also known as CSI, that used a set of simple rules and simple chemical shift tables that allowed scientists to directly use protein chemical shift assignments to rapidly determine the type and location of protein secondary structures in proteins in just seconds. Subsequently, Wishart showed how NMR chemical shifts could be used to easily and rapidly measure protein flexibility via the random coil index or RCI. Later, he showed how it was possible to use chemical shifts to determine protein backbone torsion angles with a program called PREDITOR. Wishart also determined how chemical shifts could be used to measure residue accessible surface area, and to identify super secondary structure elements. To further extend this work, Wishart developed innovative methods to determine the 3D structure of proteins using a technique called chemical shift threading with programs such as GeNMR, CS23D and E-Thrifty. To help compare and assess existing protein NMR structures, Wishart also developed methods to accurately predict protein chemical shifts from 3D coordinates using programs such as ShiftX and ShiftX2. At the same time he also developed methods to re-reference incorrectly assigned protein chemical shifts using programs such as SHIFTCOR and PANAV. These programs were used to help create protein NMR databases such as RefDB that contain 1000s of re-referenced chemical shifts. Wishart's papers describing these NMR methods have been cited more than 15,000 times and are now considered to be foundational techniques for much of modern protein NMR.

=== Metabolomics ===
In the early 2000s, Wishart turned his attention from looking at big molecules such as proteins to looking at small molecules (metabolites). In 2001 he developed and then patented NMR-based techniques (leading to the spin-off company Chenomx) that permitted the rapid identification and quantification of metabolites by NMR in biofluids. In 2005, he conceived of the Human Metabolome Project (HMP) – the metabolomic equivalent of the Human Genome Project. Wishart raised over $10 million in funding from Genome Canada and launched a multi-institutional, pan-Canadian program to systematically identify all metabolites, drugs and xenobiotics in clinically important human biofluids. The goal of HMP is to provide the scientific community with easily accessible reference data about human metabolites, thereby making metabolomic data analysis more comprehensive and much simpler. As of 2022, the HMP is still ongoing and has led to the identification of more than 240,000 human metabolites, 6000 drugs and drug metabolites, 70,000 food constituents and 3000 toxins and contaminants. This information, along with many tools to facilitate metabolite identification and interpretation, have been archived in several publicly available databases created by the Wishart lab. These include the Human Metabolome Database (HMDB), which contains data on human metabolites and their structures, along with descriptions, NMR spectra and mass spectrometry (MS) spectra. Another resource developed from the project is DrugBank, a database of all known, approved drugs and their target molecules. Other databases developed by the Wishart lab include FooDB, a database of food constituents and food additives; Toxin and Toxin-Target Database (T3DB, a database of toxic compounds and environmental contaminants as well as their toxicological effects; and the Microbial Metabolome Database (MiMeDB), a database of the human microbiome and the metabolites that it produces.

In 2011, Wishart founded The Metabolomics Innovation Centre (TMIC) and served as its first director (2011-2019). Wishart's laboratory within TMIC houses over $8 million in modern LC-MS, GC-MS and NMR equipment. His lab routinely processes more than 20,000 samples each year. Using this wide array of equipment, Wishart helped develop a number of quantitative metabolomics techniques for NMR and liquid chromatography mass spectrometry. Using these methods, Wishart and his team have conducted comprehensive, quantitative metabolome analyses of human serum, urine, saliva, cerebrospinal fluid and feces.

=== Computational biology and open science ===
Wishart has made all his lab's data resources, computer programs, algorithms and techniques publicly accessible. This open science/open access initiative has been aimed at providing tools and techniques to make biomolecular NMR, metabolomics, structural biology and a number of related techniques more accessible for all scientists. So far, this initiative has led Wishart's lab to develop and release more than 100 publicly accessible web servers and web-based databases, including Natural Products Magnetic resonance Database (NP-MRD) and Competitive Fragmentation Modeling for Metabolite Identification (CFM-ID). To further his open-science efforts, Wishart co-founded several educational bioinformatics programs such as the Canadian Bioinformatics Workshops and has been actively involved in other international standardization and open-source initiatives to make computational biology resources more widely available and accessible.

== Awards and Honors ==
- Recipient of the 2025 Gerhard Herzberg Canada Gold Medal for Science and Engineering, Canada's highest award for science and engineering, recognizing his pioneering contributions to metabolomics, bioinformatics, precision medicine, and health data science
- Recipient of the 2025 University Cup, the highest honor awarded to academic staff at the University of Alberta
- Recipient of the 2025 ASTech Award for Artificial Intelligence, Machine Learning and Quantum Computing
- Recipient of the 2026 Governor General's Innovation Award for pioneering and defining the field of metabolomics and for developing foundational databases including HMDB, DrugBank and FooDB
- Recipient of the 2024 Brockhouse Canada Prize for Interdisciplinary Research in Science and Engineering (Wishart & Greiner) from the Natural Sciences and Engineering Research Council of Canada, recognizing outstanding achievements arising from interdisciplinary collaboration
- Recipient in 2023 of a Canada Research Chair Tier 1 in Metabolomics and Precision Medicine
- Appointed in 2018 as a Distinguished University Professor in both the Department of Biological Sciences and the Department of Computing Science
- Elected in 2017 a Fellow of the Royal Society of Canada
- From 2014-2025, consistently ranked among the Top 200 Most Influential Researchers for Biological Sciences/Biochemistry by the Thomson Reuters/Clarivate Analytics
- In 2014, awarded Lifetime Honorary Fellow of the International Metabolomics Society

== Personal life ==
Wishart is married to Debby Waldman, a freelance writer and editor from Utica, New York. He has two children: Elizabeth, an epidemiologist; and Noah, a civil engineer. They all live and work in Edmonton, Alberta.
