= Probabilistic Approach for Protein NMR Assignment Validation =

PANAV
Content
- Description: For protein chemical shift re-referencing
- Data types captured: Data input: Chemical shift assignments in BMRB, NEF, SHIFTX or SHIFTY format; Data output: Reference-corrected chemical shift assignments

Contact
- Research center: University of Alberta
- Laboratory: David S. Wishart

Access
- Website: http://panav.wishartlab.com

Miscellaneous
- Curation policy: Manually curated (last update: 2015)

Probabilistic Approach for protein NMR Assignment Validation (PANAV) is a freely available stand-alone program that is used for protein chemical shift re-referencing. Chemical shift referencing is a problem in protein nuclear magnetic resonance as >20% of reported NMR chemical shift assignments appear to be improperly referenced. For certain nuclei (especially 13C and 15N) these referencing issues can cause systematic chemical shift errors of between 1.0 and 2.5 ppm. Chemical shift errors of this magnitude often make it very difficult to compare NMR chemical shift assignments between proteins. It also makes it very hard to structurally interpret chemical shifts (i.e. identify secondary structures or perform chemical shift refinement). Unlike most other chemical shift re-referencing tools PANAV employs a structure-independent protocol. That is, with PANAV there is no need to know the structure of the protein in advance of correcting any chemical shift referencing errors. This makes PANAV particularly useful for NMR studies involving novel or newly assigned proteins, where the structure has yet to be determined. Indeed, this scenario represents the vast majority of assignment cases in biomolecular NMR. PANAV uses residue-specific and secondary structure-specific chemical shift distributions that were calculated over short (3-6 residue) fragments of correctly referenced proteins (found in RefDB) to identify mis-assigned resonances. More specifically, PANAV compares the initial (i.e. observed) chemical shift assignments to the expected chemical shifts based on their local sequence and expected/predicted secondary structure. In this way, PANAV is able to identify and re-reference mis-referenced chemical shift assignments. PANAV can also identify potentially mis-assigned resonances as well. PANAV has been extensively tested and compared against a large number of existing re-referencing or mis-assignment detection programs (most of which are structure-based). These assessments indicate that PANAV is equal to or superior to existing approaches.

== See also ==
- Protein secondary structure
- Protein Chemical Shift Prediction
- Chemical shift index
