= PREDITOR =

Content
- Description: For automated torsion angle prediction from chemical shifts
- Data types captured: Data input: Protein chemical shift assignments (BMRB or SHIFTY format); Data output: Predicted phi, psi, omega and chi-1 torsion angles

Contact
- Research center: University of Alberta
- Laboratory: David S. Wishart

Access
- Website: http://wishart.biology.ualberta.ca/shiftor/cgi-bin/shiftor_1f.py

Miscellaneous
- Data release frequency: Last update 2012
- Curation policy: Manually curated

PREDITOR (PREDIction of TORsion angles) is a freely available web-server for the prediction of protein torsion angles from chemical shifts. For many years it has been known that protein chemical shifts are sensitive to protein secondary structure, which in turn, is sensitive to backbone torsion angles. torsion angles are internal coordinates that can be used to describe the conformation of a polypeptide chain. They can also be used as constraints to help determine or refine protein structures via NMR spectroscopy. In proteins there are four major torsion angles of interest: phi, psi, omega and chi-1. Traditionally protein NMR spectroscopists have used vicinal J-coupling information and the Karplus relation to determine approximate backbone torsion angle constraints for phi and chi-1 angles. However, several studies in the early 1990s pointed out the strong relationship between 1H and 13C chemical shifts and torsion angles, especially with backbone phi and psi angles. Later a number of other papers pointed out additional chemical shift relationships with chi-1 and even omega angles. PREDITOR was designed to exploit these experimental observations and to help NMR spectroscopists easily predict protein torsion angles from chemical shift assignments. Specifically, PREDITOR accepts protein sequence and/or chemical shift data as input and generates torsion angle predictions for phi, psi, omega and chi-1 angles. The algorithm that PREDITOR uses combines sequence alignment, chemical shift alignment and a number of related chemical shift analysis techniques to predict torsion angles. PREDITOR is unusually fast (<40 s per protein) and exhibits a very high level of accuracy. In a series of tests 88% of PREDITOR’s phi/psi predictions were within 30 degrees of the correct values, 84% of chi-1 predictions (3-state predictions) were correct and 99.97% of PREDITOR’s predicted omega angles were correct. PREDITOR also estimates the torsion angle errors so that its torsion angle constraints can be used with standard protein structure refinement software, such as CYANA, CNS, XPLOR and AMBER. PREDITOR also supports automated protein chemical shift re-referencing and the prediction of proline cis/trans states. PREDITOR is not the only torsion angle prediction software available. Several other computer programs including TALOS, TALOS+ and DANGLE have also been developed to predict backbone torsion angles from protein chemical shifts. These stand-alone programs exhibit similar prediction performance to PREDITOR but are substantially slower.

== See also ==
- Chemical shift
- Protein Chemical Shift Re-Referencing
- Protein secondary structure
- Chemical shift index
- Protein NMR
