= RefDB (chemistry) =

Content
- Description: Chemical Shift database
- Data types captured: Re-referenced protein and polypeptide chemical shift assignments

Contact
- Research center: University of Alberta
- Laboratory: David S. Wishart
- Primary citation: RefDB: A database of uniformly referenced protein chemical shifts.

Access
- Website: http://refdb.wishartlab.com/
- Download URL: http://refdb.wishartlab.com/

Miscellaneous
- Data release frequency: Weekly with periodic corrections and updates
- Curation policy: Automatically curated

The Re-referenced Protein Chemical shift Database (RefDB) is an NMR spectroscopy database of carefully corrected or re-referenced chemical shifts, derived from the BioMagResBank (BMRB) (Fig. 1). The database was assembled by using a structure-based chemical shift calculation program (called SHIFTX) to calculate expected protein (1)H, (13)C and (15)N chemical shifts from X-ray or NMR coordinate data of previously assigned proteins reported in the BMRB. The comparison is automatically performed by a program called SHIFTCOR. The RefDB database currently provides reference-corrected chemical shift data on more than 2000 assigned peptides and proteins. Data from the database indicates that nearly 25% of BMRB entries with (13)C protein assignments and 27% of BMRB entries with (15)N protein assignments require significant chemical shift reference readjustments. Additionally, nearly 40% of protein entries deposited in the BioMagResBank appear to have at least one assignment error. Users may download, search or browse the database through a number of methods available through the RefDB website. RefDB provides a standard chemical shift resource for biomolecular NMR spectroscopists, wishing to derive or compute chemical shift trends in peptides and proteins.

== Scope and Access ==
All data in RefDB is non-proprietary or is derived from a non-proprietary source. It is freely accessible and available to anyone. In addition, nearly every data item is fully traceable and explicitly referenced to the original source. RefDB data is available through a public web interface and downloads.

== Features ==
All chemical shifts in RefDB have been computationally re-referenced to DSS (a common NMR chemical shift standard). RefDB is a continuously updated resource that uses web-bots to query public databases (BMRB, GenBank, Protein Data Bank) and fetch assignment, sequence and structure data on a weekly basis. It then applies a series of data checking routines (using keywords to remove paramagnetic or denatured proteins) followed by a series of calculations to identify and correct chemical shift referencing errors. RefDB is fully web-enabled database, it stores data in two standard formats (NMR-STAR and Shifty), it performs automated data updating, checking and validation and it provides open access to output data in a fully downloadable flat file format as well as in a hyperlinked browsable table (see Fig. 2). RefDB also supports keyword queries and sequence searches (using local BLAST). RefDB is usually updated on a weekly basis. The RefDB database, along with its associated software, is freely available at http://refdb.wishartlab.com and at the BMRB website.

== Protocols ==
RefDB has been prepared using a combination of three different computer programs. The first program (SHIFTX) calculates backbone 1H, 13C and 15N chemical shifts from protein 3D coordinate data. The second program (SHIFTCOR) compares the calculated shifts with the observed shifts, evaluates any statistically significant differences and performs the necessary chemical shift corrections. The third program (UPDATE) automatically retrieves newly deposited BMRB data along with any corresponding PDB data. UPDATE also directs the data to SHIFTCOR and appends the ‘corrected’ chemical shift file to the RefDB database.

== What RefDB provides ==
- A downloadable database of 2162 re-referenced protein chemical shift files
- A comprehensive list of BMRB and re-referenced BMRB entries with corresponding PDB entries (See Fig. 2)
- A tab-delimited summary of all RefDB entries
- Secondary structure information for each protein sequence in shifty format
- Statistical information
  - Referencing errors (in ppm) for backbone atoms
  - Averaged backbone chemical shift values for secondary structure assignments (Alpha-helix, beta and coil)

== See also ==
- Chemical Shift
- SHIFTCOR
- Protein structure database
- Protein Chemical Shift Re-Referencing
- Protein secondary structure
- Protein Chemical Shift Prediction
- Chemical shift index
- Protein NMR

== General References ==
- Wishart, DS (Feb 2011). "Interpreting protein chemical shift data". Progress in Nuclear Magnetic Resonance Spectroscopy. 58 (1–2): 62–87. Bibcode:2011PNMRS..58...62W. doi:10.1016/j.pnmrs.2010.07.004. PMID 21241884.
- Wishart, DS; Case DA (2001). "Use of Chemical Shifts in Macromolecular Structure Determination". Nuclear Magnetic Resonance of Biological Macromolecules Part A. Methods in Enzymology. Vol. 338. pp. 3–34. doi:10.1016/s0076-6879(02)38214-4. ISBN 9780121822392. PMID 11460554.
- Wang, L; Eghbalnia HR; Bahrami A; Markley JL (May 2005). "Linear analysis of carbon-13 chemical shift differences and its application to the detection and correction of errors in referencing and spin system identifications". Journal of Biomolecular NMR. 32 (1): 13–22. doi:10.1007/s10858-005-1717-0. PMID 16041479. S2CID 33690078.
