= ShiftX =

Content
- Description: Protein chemical shift calculation server

Contact
- Research center: University of Alberta
- Laboratory: Dr. David Wishart

Access
- Data format: Data Input: X-ray or NMR coordinates (PDB format); Data Output: 1H, 13C and 15N chemical shifts (Shifty or BMRB format)
- Website: http://shiftx.wishartlab.com/; http://www.shiftx2.ca/; http://www.shiftx2.ca/download.html

Miscellaneous
- Curation policy: Manually curated

ShiftX (Shifts from X-ray structures) is a freely available web server for rapidly calculating protein chemical shifts from protein X-ray (or NMR) coordinates. Protein chemical shift prediction (also known as protein chemical shift calculation) is particularly useful in verifying protein chemical shift assignments, adjusting mis-referenced chemical shifts, refining NMR protein structures (via chemical shifts) and assisting with the NMR assignment of unassigned proteins that have either had their structures (or the structures of a homologous protein) determined by X-ray or NMR methods.

The ShiftX web server takes atomic coordinates (PDB s format) of proteins as input and quickly (<1 sec) generates the chemical shifts of both backbone (1H, 13C and 15N) and side chain (1H only) atoms as output (BMRB or Shifty format). The server is optimized to work with diamagnetic proteins rather than paramagnetic proteins (i.e. proteins with paramagnetic centers). The ShiftX web server is based on a program of the same name that was developed in 2003 by members of Dr. David Wishart’s laboratory. Both the ShiftX program and the ShiftX web server make use of pre-calculated, empirically derived chemical shift tables relating 1H, 13C and 15N chemical shifts to backbone torsion angles, side chain orientations, local secondary structure and nearest neighbor effects. These tables were derived using data mining techniques from a large database of reference-corrected protein chemical shifts called RefDB. These sequence/structure dependencies on chemical shifts, which cannot easily be converted to analytical formulae, are combined with standard classical or semi-classical equations (for ring current effects and hydrogen bond effects) to further improve the 1H, 13C and 15N chemical shift calculations. ShiftX differs from other protein chemical shift calculation techniques in that it blends both empirical observations with classical or semi-quantum mechanical approaches. Most other protein chemical shift calculation methods use either empirical (such as SPARTA) or quantum mechanical (such as ShiftS) approaches, exclusively. ShiftX is both fast and accurate. It has a correlation coefficient (r) between measured and calculated shifts of 0.91(1HA), 0.98 (13CA), 0.99 (13CB), 0.86 (13CO), 0.91 (15N), 0.74 (1HN), and 0.907 (side chain 1H) with RMS errors of 0.23, 0.98, 1.10, 1.16, 2.43, 0.49, and 0.30 ppm. ShiftX is used in several programs or web servers including ShiftCor. It is also used in the generation and updating of the re-referenced chemical shift database known as RefDB.

Recently, substantial improvements to the performance of ShiftX were achieved by using machine learning methods to better integrate protein structure features (including solvent accessible surface area) and local or nearest-neighbor interactions. This led to the release of an updated version of ShiftX called ShiftX2. ShiftX2 is substantially more accurate than ShiftX and it is able to calculate a much larger collection of side chain chemical shifts (1H, 13C and 15N). It is also available as a freely accessible web server. However, it is 2-3X slower. ShiftX2 achieves correlation coefficients between experimentally observed and predicted backbone chemical shifts of 0.98 (15N), 0.99 (13CA), 0.999 (13CB), 0.97 (13CO), 0.97 (1HN), 0.98 (1HA) with corresponding RMS errors of 1.12, 0.44, 0.51, 0.53, 0.17, and 0.12 ppm.

== See also ==
- Protein
- Protein NMR
- NMR
- Chemical shift
- Random Coil Index
- Protein Chemical Shift Re-Referencing
- Protein secondary structure
- Protein Chemical Shift Prediction
- Protein structure prediction
- Crystallography
- Protein data bank
