= Cynthia Jameson =

Emeritus Professor of Chemistry

- Born: Philippines
- Education: University of the Philippines; University of Illinois at Urbana–Champaign
- Known for: NMR
- Scientific career
- Workplaces: University of Illinois at Chicago; Columbia University; University of California, Berkeley

Cynthia J. Jameson is an Emeritus Professor of Chemistry at the University of Illinois. She works on nuclear magnetic resonance spectroscopy and quantum chemistry. Jameson dedicated her academic career to supporting women scientists. She is a Fellow of the American Association for the Advancement of Science.

== Early life and education ==
Jameson was born in the Philippines. She completed her bachelor's degree in chemistry at the University of the Philippines in 1958. She graduated magna cum laude. She moved to America for her graduate studies, earning a PhD as a Fulbright Program scholar at the University of Illinois at Urbana–Champaign in 1963. Her graduate work involved the prediction of chemical shifts in nuclear magnetic resonance spectroscopy under the supervision of Herbert S. Gutowsky. She was awarded the Eastman Award for the most outstanding chemistry graduate student. She completed postdoctoral studies with Martin Karplus at Columbia University. She mapped the NMR Chemical Shift and indirect coupling constants across the whole periodic table. She worked won the relationship between dihedral angle and spin-orbit coupling.

== Research and career ==
In 1968, Jameson returned to University of Illinois at Chicago as an assistant professor. She was made full Professor in 1976. Jameson spent time as a visiting scientist at the University of Cambridge, University of Oxford and Queen's University. Her work uses quantum chemistry and molecular dynamics to understand molecular electronic properties such as nuclear magnetic shielding. Jameson worked on NMR in the gas and liquid phase to establish inter and intra-molecular effects on NMR parameters. She looked at how isotopic substitution impacted the chemical shift of NMR, and used rotational–vibrational averaging theory to explain intramolecular effects, such as isotope effects and the temperature dependence of shifts in NMR. She used gas phase NMR to extract relaxation times that allowed calculation of effective collision cross-sections. She described how NMR shifts could be used as a paradigm for electronic properties of molecules.

Jameson established the field of ^{129}Xe NMR to study local environments with high sensitivity and fast data acquisition. She used ^{129}Xe and grand canonical Monte Carlo simulations to study adsorption and diffusion in zeolites. She provided the mathematical explanation for the chemical shift and spin-spin coupling observed in NMR spectroscopy of chiral materials. She contributed to the book Multinuclear NMR, which provided information about the theory and observations in nuclear magnetic resonance spectroscopy of various nuclei. She was the first woman to deliver NMR section Rocky Mountain Conference on Analytical Chemistry Vaughan Lecture in 2000. She spent a year as a Visiting Miller Professor at the University of California, Berkeley. In 2008 Jameson returned to the Philippines to teach a quantum chemistry course for university teachers. She is a member of the Philippine-American Academy of Science and Engineering.

=== Academic service and advocacy ===
In 2003 Jameson was part of the University of Illinois at Chicago National Science Foundation ADVANCE program WISET, which looked to support women in science and engineering. Jameson designed the Postdoc Institute at University of Illinois at Chicago. She was recognised by the University of Illinois at Chicago as Woman of the Year. She delivered the Jean Dreyfus Boissevain Lecture at Washington & Jefferson College. Jameson was a member of the Chicago chapter of the American Chemical Society, where she helped to judge the Josiah Willard Gibbs Award from 2006. Before Jameson joined the committee, the award had been presented to 94 men and 1 woman - as of 2019, it has been won by more than 6 women.
