= Elkan Blout =

American biochemist

Elkan R. Blout
- Born: July 2, 1919; Manhattan, New York, US
- Died: December 20, 2006 (aged 87); Boston, Massachusetts, US
- Education: Princeton University (BA), Columbia University (PhD)
- Known for: Studies of protein conformation
- Awards: National Medal of Science
- Scientific career
- Fields: Biochemistry
- Workplaces: Polaroid Corporation, Boston Children's Hospital, Harvard University
- Thesis: Studies on lactones related to the cardiac aglycones
- Doctoral advisor: Robert Elderfield
- Other academic advisors: Louis Fieser; Robert Burns Woodward
- Doctoral students: John Markley; Lila Gierasch; Gideon Dreyfuss

Elkan Rogers Blout (July 2, 1919 – December 20, 2006) was a biochemist at Polaroid Corporation, Boston Children's Hospital, and the Edward S. Harkness Professor of Biological Chemistry, emeritus at Harvard University.

Blout completed a BA at Princeton University (chemistry) in 1939, followed by a PhD at Columbia University in 1942.

Blout was elected to the United States National Academy of Sciences in 1969. In 1990, he was awarded the National Medal of Science "for his pioneering studies of protein conformation and devotion to the scientific enterprise of the Nation".

Blout died in December 2006, in Boston.
