= Tetramethylsilane =

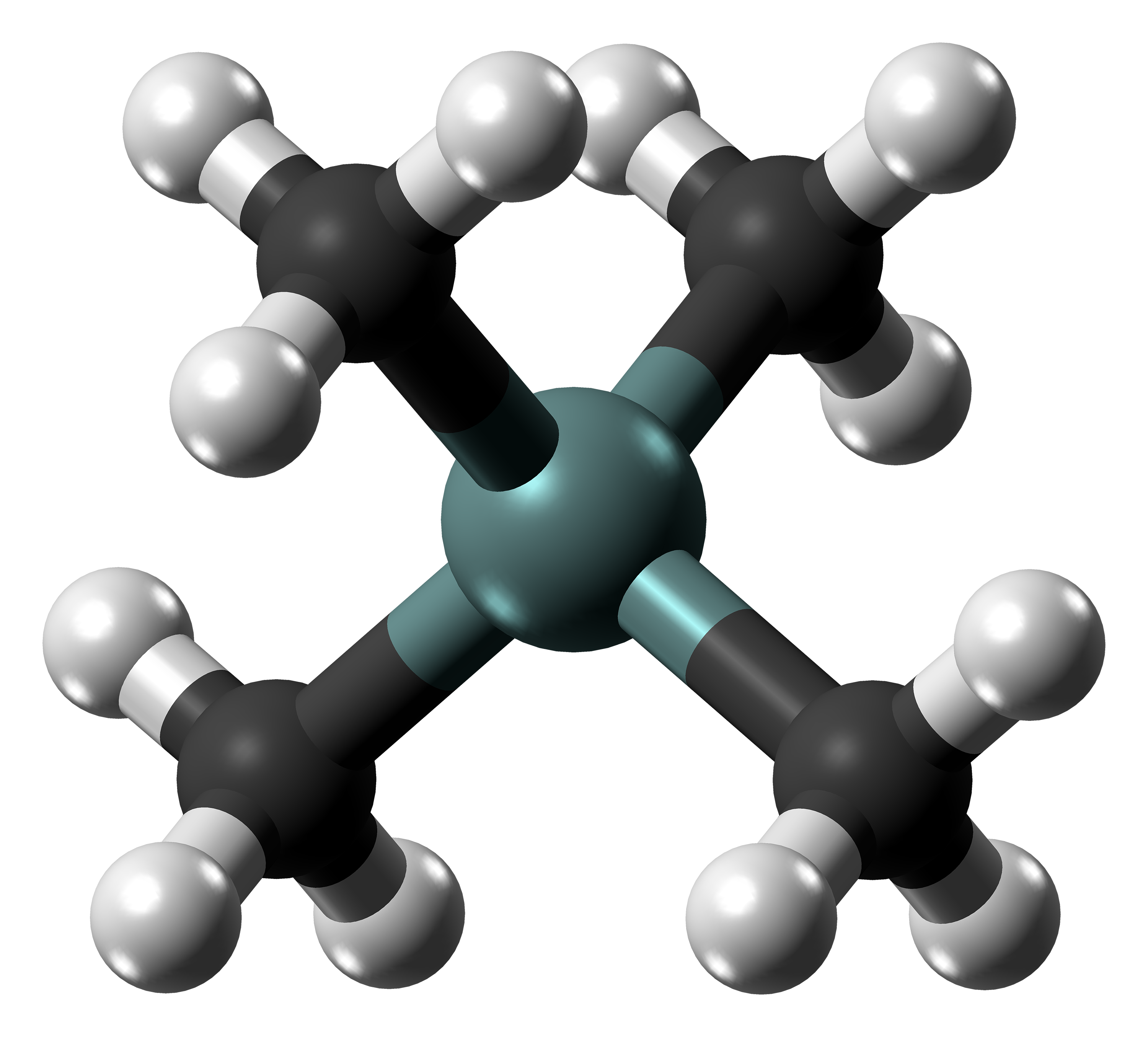

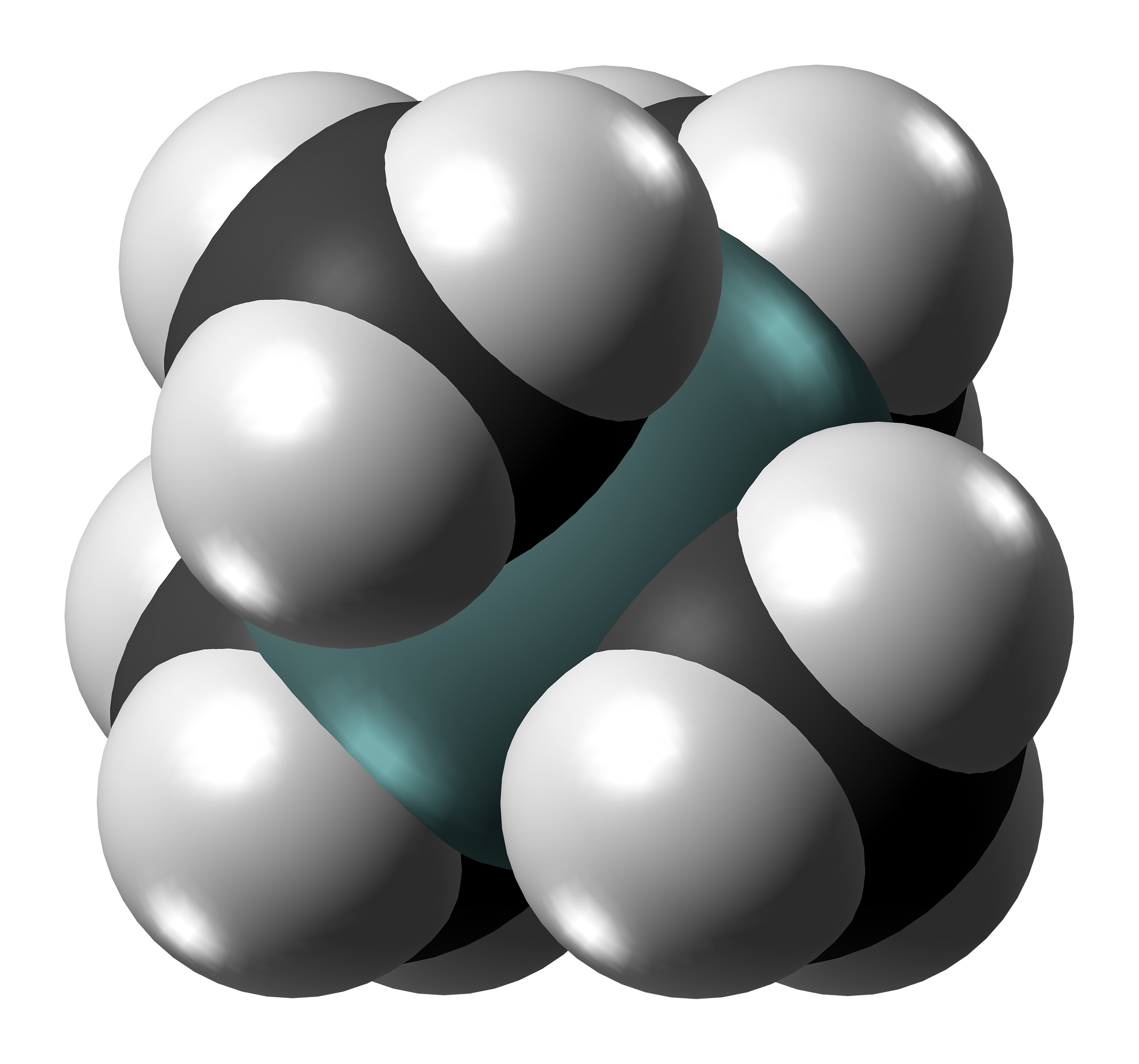

Names
- Preferred IUPAC name Tetramethylsilane

Identifiers
CAS Number	75-76-3
3D model (JSmol)	Interactive image
Abbreviations	TMS
Beilstein Reference	1696908
ChEBI	CHEBI:85361
ChEMBL	ChEMBL68073
ChemSpider	6156
ECHA InfoCard	100.000.818
EC Number	200-899-1
MeSH	Tetramethylsilane
PubChem CID	6396
RTECS number	VV5705400
UNII	41Y0RBG14Q
UN number	2749
CompTox Dashboard (EPA)	DTXSID9026423
- InChI: InChI=1S/C4H12Si/c1-5(2,3)4/h1-4H3 Key: CZDYPVPMEAXLPK-UHFFFAOYSA-N
- SMILES: C[Si](C)(C)C

Properties
Chemical formula	C_{4}H_{12}Si
Molar mass	88.225 g·mol^{−1}
Appearance	Colourless liquid
Density	0.648 g cm^{−3}
Melting point	−99 to −102 °C (−146 to −152 °F; 174 to 171 K)
Boiling point	26 to 28 °C (79 to 82 °F; 299 to 301 K)
Solubility	organic solvents

Structure
Molecular shape	Tetrahedral at carbon and silicon
Dipole moment	0 D

Hazards
- GHS labelling
Pictograms	(GHS02: Flammable) (GHS05: Corrosive) (GHS09: Environmental hazard)
Signal word	Danger
Hazard statements	H224, H302, H411
Precautionary statements	P210, P233, P240, P241, P242, P243, P264, P270, P273, P280, P301+P312, P303+P361+P353, P330, P370+P378, P391, P403+P235, P501
NFPA 704 (fire diamond)	3 4 1
Flash point	−28 to −27 °C (–18 to –16 °F), vapor may be pyrophoric

Related compounds
Related silanes	Silane; Silicon tetrabromide; Silicon tetrachloride; Silicon tetrafluoride; Silicon tetraiodide; Hexamethyldisilane
Related compounds	Neopentane; Tetramethylgermane; Tetramethyltin; Tetramethyllead
- Except where otherwise noted, data are given for materials in their standard state (at 25 °C [77 °F], 100 kPa). verify (what is ?) Infobox references

Tetramethylsilane (abbreviated as TMS) is the organosilicon compound with the formula Si(CH_{3})_{4}. It is a colorless liquid. It is the simplest tetraorganosilane. Like all silanes, the TMS framework is tetrahedral. TMS is a building block in organometallic chemistry but also finds use in diverse niche applications.

== Synthesis and reactions ==
TMS is a by-product of the production of methyl chlorosilanes, SiCl_{x}(CH_{3})_{4−x}, via the direct process of reacting methyl chloride with silicon. The more useful products of this reaction are those for x = 1 (trimethylsilyl chloride), 2 (dimethyldichlorosilane), and 3 (methyltrichlorosilane).

TMS undergoes deprotonation upon treatment with butyllithium to give (H_{3}C)_{3}SiCH_{2}Li. The latter, trimethylsilylmethyl lithium, is a relatively common alkylating agent.

Contrariwise, shaking with sulfuric acid gives methane and trimethylsilyl bisulfate.

In chemical vapor deposition, TMS is the precursor to silicon dioxide or silicon carbide, depending on the deposition conditions. In the formation of silicon carbide, carbosilanes, such as 1,3,5,7-tetramethyl-1,3,5,7-tetrasilaadamantane, are observed as intermediates.

== Uses in NMR spectroscopy ==
Tetramethylsilane is the accepted internal standard for calibrating chemical shift for ^{1}H, ^{13}C and ^{29}Si NMR spectroscopy in organic solvents (where TMS is soluble). In water, where it is not soluble, sodium salts of DSS, 2,2-dimethyl-2-silapentane-5-sulfonate, are used instead. Because of its high volatility, TMS can easily be evaporated, which is convenient for recovery of samples analyzed by NMR spectroscopy.

Because all twelve hydrogen atoms in a tetramethylsilane molecule are equivalent, its ^{1}H NMR spectrum consists of a singlet. The chemical shift of this singlet is assigned as δ 0, and all other chemical shifts are determined relative to it. The majority of compounds studied by ^{1}H NMR spectroscopy absorb downfield of the TMS signal, thus there is usually no interference between the standard and the sample. Similarly, all four carbon atoms in a tetramethylsilane molecule are equivalent. In a fully decoupled ^{13}C NMR spectrum, the carbon in the tetramethylsilane appears as a singlet, allowing for easy identification. The chemical shift of this singlet is also set to be δ 0 in the ^{13}C spectrum, and all other chemical shifts are determined relative to it.
