= PDBsum =

Pictorial database of 3D structures in the Protein Data Bank

PDBSum

Content
- Description: Overview of the structures contained within the Protein Data Bank.
- Data types captured: Protein structures
- Organisms: all

Contact
- Research center: European Bioinformatics Institute (EBI)
- Authors: Roman Laskowski & al. (1997)
- Primary citation: PMID 9433130

Access
- Website: www.ebi.ac.uk/pdbsum/

Miscellaneous
- Bookmarkable entities: yes

PDBsum is a database that provides an overview of the contents of each 3D macromolecular structure deposited in the Protein Data Bank (PDB).

== Database ==
The original version of the database was developed around 1995 by Roman Laskowski and collaborators at University College London. As of 2014, PDBsum is maintained by Laskowski and collaborators in the laboratory of Janet Thornton at the European Bioinformatics Institute (EBI).

Each structure in the PDBsum database includes an image of structure (main view, Bottom view and right view), molecular components contained in the complex(structure), enzyme reaction diagram if appropriate, Gene ontology functional assignments, a 1D sequence annotated by Pfam and InterPro domain assignments, description of bound molecules and graphic showing interactions between protein and secondary structure, schematic diagrams of protein–protein interactions, analysis of clefts contained within the structure and links to external databases. The RasMol and Jmol molecular graphics software are used to provide a 3D view of molecules and their interactions within PDBsum.

Since the release of the 1000 Genomes Project in October 2012, all single amino acid variants identified by the project have been mapped to the corresponding protein sequences in the Protein Data Bank. These variants are also displayed within PDBsum, cross-referenced to the relevant UniProt identifier. PDBsum contains a number of protein structures that may be of interest in structure-based drug design. One branch of PDBsum, known as DrugPort, focuses on these models and is linked with the DrugBank drug target database.

== See also ==
- Crystallographic database
- Protein structure database
