= Shoolery's rule =

Shoolery's rule, which is named after James Nelson Shoolery, is a good approximation of the chemical shift δ of methylene groups in proton nuclear magnetic resonance. We can calculate shift of the CH_{2} protons in a A–CH_{2}–B structure using the formula

$$\delta = 0.23\,\mathrm{ppm} + S_\mathrm{A} + S_\mathrm{B}$$

where 0.23 ppm is the chemical shift of methane and the empirical adjustments S are based on the identities of the A and B groups:

Substituent	S / ppm
–CH_{3}	0.47
–COOR	1.55
–COR	1.70
–C_{6}H_{5}	1.83
–SR	1.64
–I	1.82
–Br	2.33
–OR	2.36
–Cl	2.53
–OH	2.56
–OCOR	3.13

Shoolery's rule is a particular instance of a general class of rules of the form

$$\delta = b_0 + \sum_i z_i$$,

with two substituents on methylene resulting in two parameters $S_A$ and $S_B$.
