= 1,3,5,7-Tetramethyl-1,3,5,7-tetrasilaadamantane =

Names
- Preferred IUPAC name 1,3,5,7-Tetramethyl-1,3,5,7-tetrasilaadamantane

Identifiers
CAS Number	17995-33-4
3D model (JSmol)	Interactive image
ChemSpider	123745
PubChem CID	140316
UNII	SQY6S5MRB7
CompTox Dashboard (EPA)	DTXSID70170885
- InChI: InChI=1S/C10H24Si4/c1-11-5-12(2)8-13(3,6-11)10-14(4,7-11)9-12/h5-10H2,1-4H3 Key: XMNIPURNPMVXKW-UHFFFAOYSA-N
- SMILES: C[Si]12C[Si]3(C[Si](C1)(C[Si](C2)(C3)C)C)C

Properties
Chemical formula	C_{6}H_{24}Si_{4}
Molar mass	208.598 g·mol^{−1}
Appearance	colorless solid
Melting point	244 °C (471 °F; 517 K)
- Except where otherwise noted, data are given for materials in their standard state (at 25 °C [77 °F], 100 kPa). Infobox references

1,3,5,7-Tetramethyl-1,3,5,7-tetrasilaadamantane is the organosilicon compound with the formula (CH_{2})_{6}(SiCH_{3})_{4}. It is a colorless solid that is soluble in organic solvents. The compound is one of the iconic carbosilanes, featuring alternating −Si−C−Si−C− linkages. Otherwise it can be described as a diamondoid cluster. It arises as one of many products from the pyrolysis of tetramethylsilane. A more efficient route involves the reaction of the cyclic carbosilane (CH_{2}Si(CH_{3})_{2})_{3} (1,1,3,3,5,5-hexamethyl-1,3,5-trisilacyclohexane) with aluminium tribromide.

Carbosilanes are known for several diamondoid structures.
