= (Trimethylsilyl)methyl chloride =

Names
- Preferred IUPAC name (Chloromethyl)tri(methyl)silane
- Other names (Chloromethyl)trimethylsilane

Identifiers
CAS Number	2344-80-1
3D model (JSmol)	Interactive image
ChemSpider	67897
ECHA InfoCard	100.017.326
EC Number	219-058-5
PubChem CID	75361
CompTox Dashboard (EPA)	DTXSID1062330
- InChI: InChI=1S/C4H11ClSi/c1-6(2,3)4-5/h4H2,1-3H3 Key: OOCUOKHIVGWCTJ-UHFFFAOYSA-N
- SMILES: C[Si](C)(C)CCl

Properties
Chemical formula	C_{4}H_{11}ClSi
Molar mass	122.67 g·mol^{−1}
Appearance	colorless liquid
Density	0.886 g cm^{−3}
Boiling point	97–98 °C (207–208 °F; 370–371 K)

Hazards
- GHS labelling
Pictograms	(GHS02: Flammable) (GHS07: Exclamation mark) (GHS09: Environmental hazard)
Signal word	Danger
Hazard statements	H225, H315, H319, H335, H411
Precautionary statements	P210, P233, P240, P241, P242, P243, P261, P264, P271, P273, P280, P302+P352, P303+P361+P353, P304+P340, P305+P351+P338, P312, P321, P332+P313, P337+P313, P362, P370+P378, P391, P403+P233, P403+P235, P405, P501
- Except where otherwise noted, data are given for materials in their standard state (at 25 °C [77 °F], 100 kPa). Infobox references

(Trimethylsilyl)methyl chloride is the organosilicon compound with the formula (CH_{3})_{3}SiCH_{2}Cl. A colorless, volatile liquid, it is an alkylating agent that is employed in organic synthesis, especially as a precursor to (trimethylsilyl)methyllithium. In the presence of triphenylphosphine, it olefinates benzophenones:

(CH_{3})_{3}SiCH_{2}Cl + PPh_{3} + Ar_{2}C=O → Ar_{2}C=CH_{2} + OPPh_{3} + (CH_{3})_{3}SiCl

== See also ==
- Trimethylsilyl chloride, a silyl chloride
