= SHIFTCOR =

Content
- Description: For protein chemical shift re-referencing
- Data types captured: Data input: Chemical shift assignments in BMRB or SHIFTY format and a corresponding 3D protein structure (PDB format); Data output: Reference-corrected chemical shift assignments

Contact
- Research center: University of Alberta
- Laboratory: Dr. David Wishart

Access
- Website: http://shiftcor.wishartlab.com/

Miscellaneous
- Curation policy: Manually curated (last update: 2003)

SHIFTCOR (Shift Correction) is a freely available web server as well as a stand-alone computer program for protein chemical shift re-referencing. Chemical shift referencing is a particularly widespread problem in biomolecular NMR with up to 25% of existing NMR chemical shift assignments being improperly referenced. Some of these referencing problems can lead to systematic errors of between 1.0 and 2.5 ppm (especially in 13C and 15N chemical shifts). Errors of this magnitude can play havoc with any attempt to compare assignments between proteins or to structurally interpret chemical shifts. Identifying which proteins are mis-assigned or improperly referenced can be challenging, as can correcting the errors once they are found. The SHIFTCOR program was designed to assist with identifying and fixing these chemical shift referencing problems. Specifically it compares, identifies, corrects and re-references 1H, 13C and 15N backbone chemical shifts of peptides and proteins by comparing the observed chemical shifts with the predicted chemical shifts derived from the 3D structure (using PDB coordinates) of the protein(s) of interest [1]. The predicted chemical shifts are calculated using the ShiftX program. The SHIFTCOR program was originally used to construct a database of properly re-referenced protein chemical shift assignments called RefDB. RefDB is a web-accessible database of more than 2000 correctly referenced protein chemical shift assignments. While originally available as a stand-alone program only, SHIFTCOR has since been released for general use as a web server.

== See also ==
- Chemical Shift
- NMR
- Protein
- Protein structure database
- Protein Chemical Shift Re-Referencing
- Protein secondary structure
- Protein Chemical Shift Prediction
- Chemical shift index
- Protein NMR
