= Robert Elderfield =

American chemist (1904–1979)

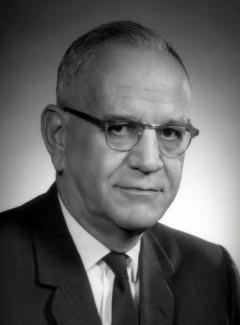
- Born: May 30, 1904; Niagara Falls, New York, US
- Died: December 10, 1979 (aged 75); Ann Arbor, Michigan, US
- Education: Massachusetts Institute of Technology; University of Michigan
- Scientific career
- Fields: Chemist
- Workplaces: Rockefeller Institute of Medical Research, Columbia University, University of Michigan
- Thesis: Alkyl guanidines and nitroguanidines (1930)
- Doctoral advisor: Tenney Lombard Davis
- Doctoral students: William Standish Knowles; Josef Fried; Elkan Blout
- Other notable students: Isaac Asimov (post-doctoral)

Robert Cooley Elderfield (May 30, 1904 – December 10, 1979) was an American chemist. He was born in Niagara Falls, New York, United States.

Elderfield studied at the Choate School in Wallingford, Connecticut, later at the University of Michigan receiving his Ph.D. from the Massachusetts Institute of Technology in 1930. He worked at the Rockefeller Institute of Medical Research from 1930 until 1936; in 1936, Elderfield changed to Columbia University. He was moved to University of Michigan in 1952.

Elderfield started his research with cardiac glycosides and cardiac aglycones shifting to the synthesis of primaquine and other antimalarials. At the end of his career, Elderfield did some research in new anticancer agents.
