= HMDB =

HMDB may refer to:

- Historical Marker Database
- Human Metabolome Database
