= (Trimethylsilyl)methyllithium =

Identifiers
CAS Number	1822-00-0
3D model (JSmol)	Interactive image
ChemSpider	2723465
ECHA InfoCard	100.157.622
EC Number	629-440-7
PubChem CID	3482579
CompTox Dashboard (EPA)	DTXSID90392901
- InChI: InChI=1S/C4H11Si.Li/c1-5(2,3)4;/h1H2,2-4H3;/q-1;+1 Key: KVWLUDFGXDFFON-UHFFFAOYSA-N
- SMILES: [Li+].C[Si](C)(C)[CH2-]

Properties
Chemical formula	C_{4}H_{11}LiSi
Molar mass	94.16 g·mol^{−1}
Appearance	white or colorless solid
Density	0.937 g/cm^{3}

Hazards
- GHS labelling
Pictograms	(GHS02: Flammable) (GHS05: Corrosive)
Signal word	Danger
Hazard statements	H225, H314
Precautionary statements	P210, P233, P240, P241, P242, P243, P260, P264, P280, P301+P330+P331, P303+P361+P353, P304+P340, P305+P351+P338, P310, P321, P363, P370+P378, P403+P235, P405, P501
- Except where otherwise noted, data are given for materials in their standard state (at 25 °C [77 °F], 100 kPa). Infobox references

(Trimethylsilyl)methyllithium is classified both as an organolithium compound and an organosilicon compound. It has the empirical formula LiCH_{2}Si(CH_{3})_{3}, often abbreviated LiCH_{2}TMS. It crystallizes as the hexagonal prismatic hexamer [LiCH_{2}TMS]_{6}, akin to some polymorphs of methyllithium. Many adducts have been characterized including the diethyl ether complexed cubane [Li_{4}(μ_{3}-CH_{2}TMS)_{4}(Et_{2}O)_{2}] and [Li_{2}(μ-CH_{2}TMS)_{2}(TMEDA)_{2}].

== Preparation ==
(Trimethylsilyl)methyllithium, which is commercially available as a THF solution, is usually prepared by treatment of (trimethylsilyl)methyl chloride with butyllithium:

(CH_{3})_{3}SiCH_{2}Cl + BuLi → (CH_{3})_{3}SiCH_{2}Li + BuCl

(Trimethylsilyl)methylmagnesium chloride is often functionally equivalent to (trimethylsilyl)methyllithium. It is prepared by the Grignard reaction of (trimethylsilyl)methyl chloride.

== Use in methylenations ==
In one example of the Peterson olefination, (trimethylsilyl)methyllithium reacts with aldehydes and ketones to give the terminal alkene (R^{1} = Me, R^{2} & R^{3} = H):

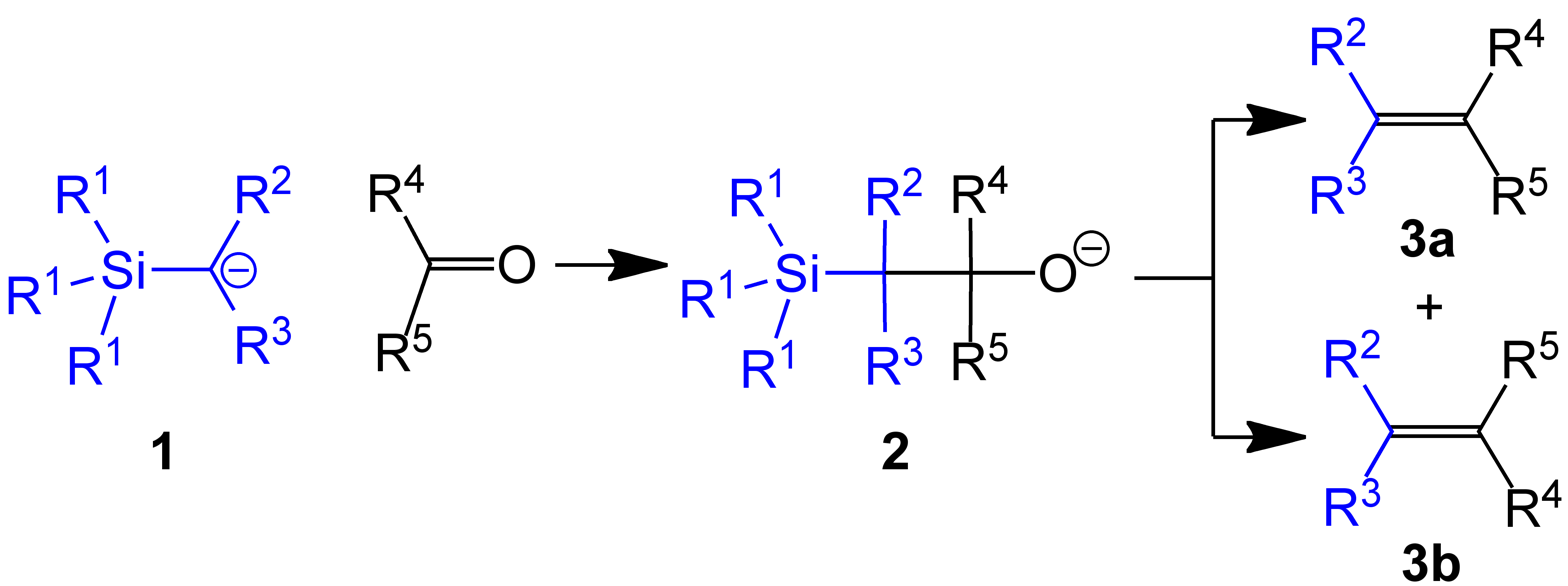

== Metal derivatives ==
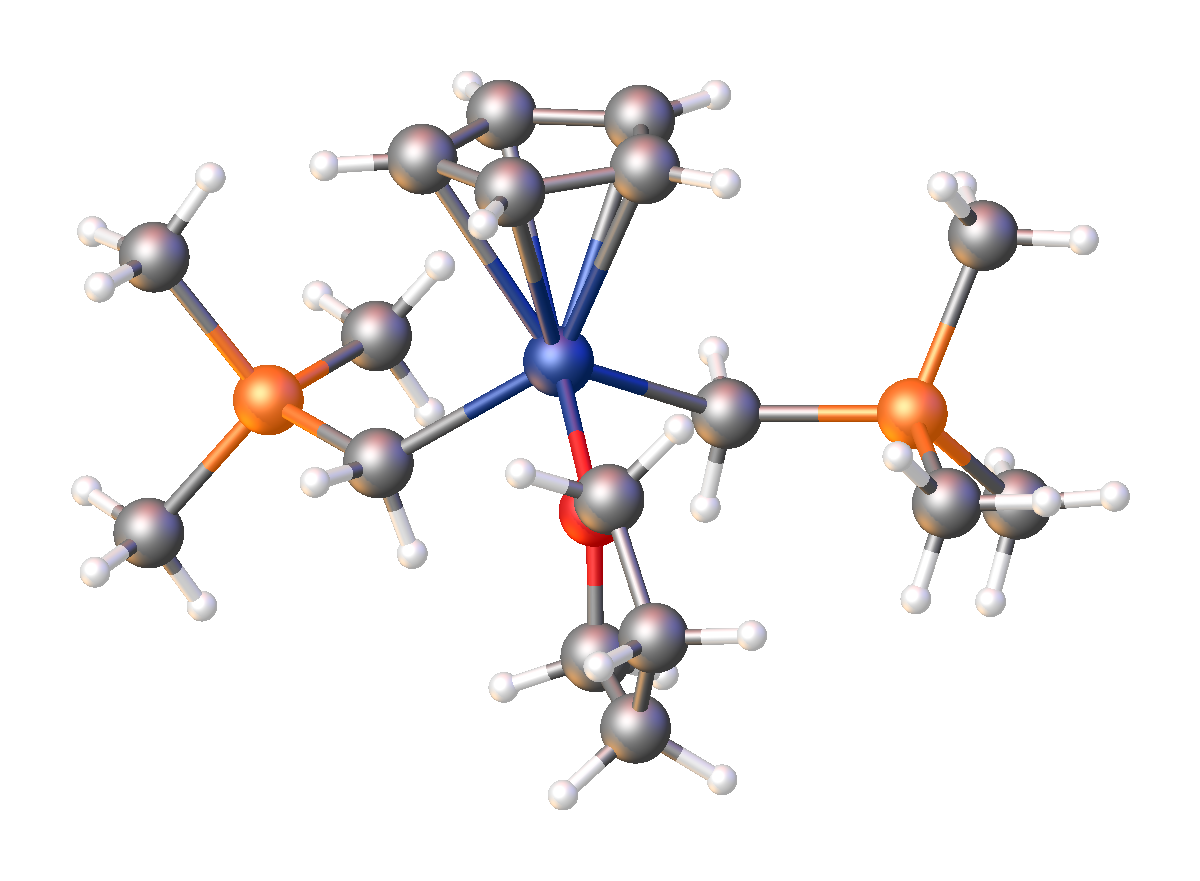
Structure of the organoscandium complex with two (trimethylsilyl)methyl ligands, (C_{5}H_{5})Sc(CH_{2}TMS)_{2}(THF). Color scheme: O (red), Sc (blue), Si (orange).

(Trimethylsilyl)methyllithium is widely used in organotransition metal chemistry to affix (trimethylsilyl)methyl ligands. Such complexes are usually produced by salt metathesis involving metal chlorides. These compounds are often highly soluble in nonpolar organic solvents, enjoying stability due to their steric bulk and resistance to beta-hydride elimination. In these regards, (trimethylsilyl)methyl is akin to neopentyl.

Bis(trimethylsilyl)methylmagnesium is used as an alternative to (trimethylsilyl)methyllithium.

== Related compounds ==
- bis(trimethylsilyl)methyllithium
- tris(trimethylsilyl)methyllithium
