= Torsion angle =

Type of dihedral angle

Free energy diagram of n-butane as a function of dihedral angle.

In stereochemistry, a torsion angle is defined as a particular example of a dihedral angle, describing the geometric relation of two parts of a molecule joined by a chemical bond. Every set of three non-colinear atoms of a molecule defines a half-plane. As explained above, when two such half-planes intersect (i.e., a set of four consecutively-bonded atoms), the angle between them is a dihedral angle. Dihedral angles are used to specify the molecular conformation. Stereochemical arrangements corresponding to angles between 0° and ±90° are called syn (s), those corresponding to angles between ±90° and 180° anti (a). Similarly, arrangements corresponding to angles between 30° and 150° or between −30° and −150° are called clinal (c) and those between 0° and ±30° or ±150° and 180° are called periplanar (p).

The two types of terms can be combined so as to define four ranges of angle; 0° to ±30° synperiplanar (sp); 30° to 90° and −30° to −90° synclinal (sc); 90° to 150° and −90° to −150° anticlinal (ac); ±150° to 180° antiperiplanar (ap). The synperiplanar conformation is also known as the syn- or cis-conformation; antiperiplanar as anti or trans; and synclinal as gauche or skew.

For example, with n-butane two planes can be specified in terms of the two central carbon atoms and either of the methyl carbon atoms. The syn-conformation shown above, with a dihedral angle of 60° is less stable than the anti-conformation with a dihedral angle of 180°.

For macromolecular usage the symbols T, C, G^{+}, G^{−}, A^{+} and A^{−} are recommended (ap, sp, +sc, −sc, +ac and −ac respectively).

Configuration names

according to dihedral angle

syn n-Butane in the

gauche^{−} conformation (−60°) Newman projection

syn n-Butane

sawhorse projection

== Proteins ==
Depiction of a protein, showing where ω, φ, & ψ refer to.

A Ramachandran plot (also known as a Ramachandran diagram or a [φ,ψ] plot), originally developed in 1963 by G. N. Ramachandran, C. Ramakrishnan, and V. Sasisekharan, is a way to visualize energetically allowed regions for backbone dihedral angles ψ against φ of amino acid residues in protein structure.

In a protein chain three dihedral angles are defined:

- ω (omega) is the angle in the chain C^{α} − C' − N − C^{α},
- φ (phi) is the angle in the chain C' − N − C^{α} − C'
- ψ (psi) is the angle in the chain N − C^{α} − C' − N (called φ′ by Ramachandran)

The figure at right illustrates the location of each of these angles (but it does not show correctly the way they are defined).

The planarity of the peptide bond usually restricts ω to be 180° (the typical trans case) or 0° (the rare cis case). The distance between the C^{α} atoms in the trans and cis isomers is approximately 3.8 and 2.9 Å, respectively. The vast majority of the peptide bonds in proteins are trans, though the peptide bond to the nitrogen of proline has an increased prevalence of cis compared to other amino-acid pairs.

The side chain dihedral angles are designated with χ_{n} (chi-n). They tend to cluster near 180°, 60°, and −60°, which are called the trans, gauche^{−}, and gauche^{+} conformations. The stability of certain sidechain dihedral angles is affected by the values φ and ψ. For instance, there are direct steric interactions between the Cγ of the side chain in the gauche^{+} rotamer and the backbone nitrogen of the next residue when ψ is near −60°. This is evident from statistical distributions in backbone-dependent rotamer libraries.
