= Carbosilanes =

Class of chemical compounds

1,3,5,7-Tetramethyl-1,3,5,7-tetrasilaadamantane, one of several diamondoid carbosilanes.

Carbosilanes are organosilicon compounds where the structures feature alternating silicon and carbon atoms, i.e., −Si−C−Si−C− linkages. They represent molecular analogues of silicon carbide. The compounds exploit the tendency of both carbon and silicon to form tetrahedral structures. The inventory of carbosilanes is large.

== Synthesis and structure ==
The compounds originally were obtained as products of the pyrolysis of simple organosilicon precursors such as the methylsilanes. More efficient precursors contain premade −Si−C−Si−C− subunits.
