= Trimethylsilylpropanoic acid =

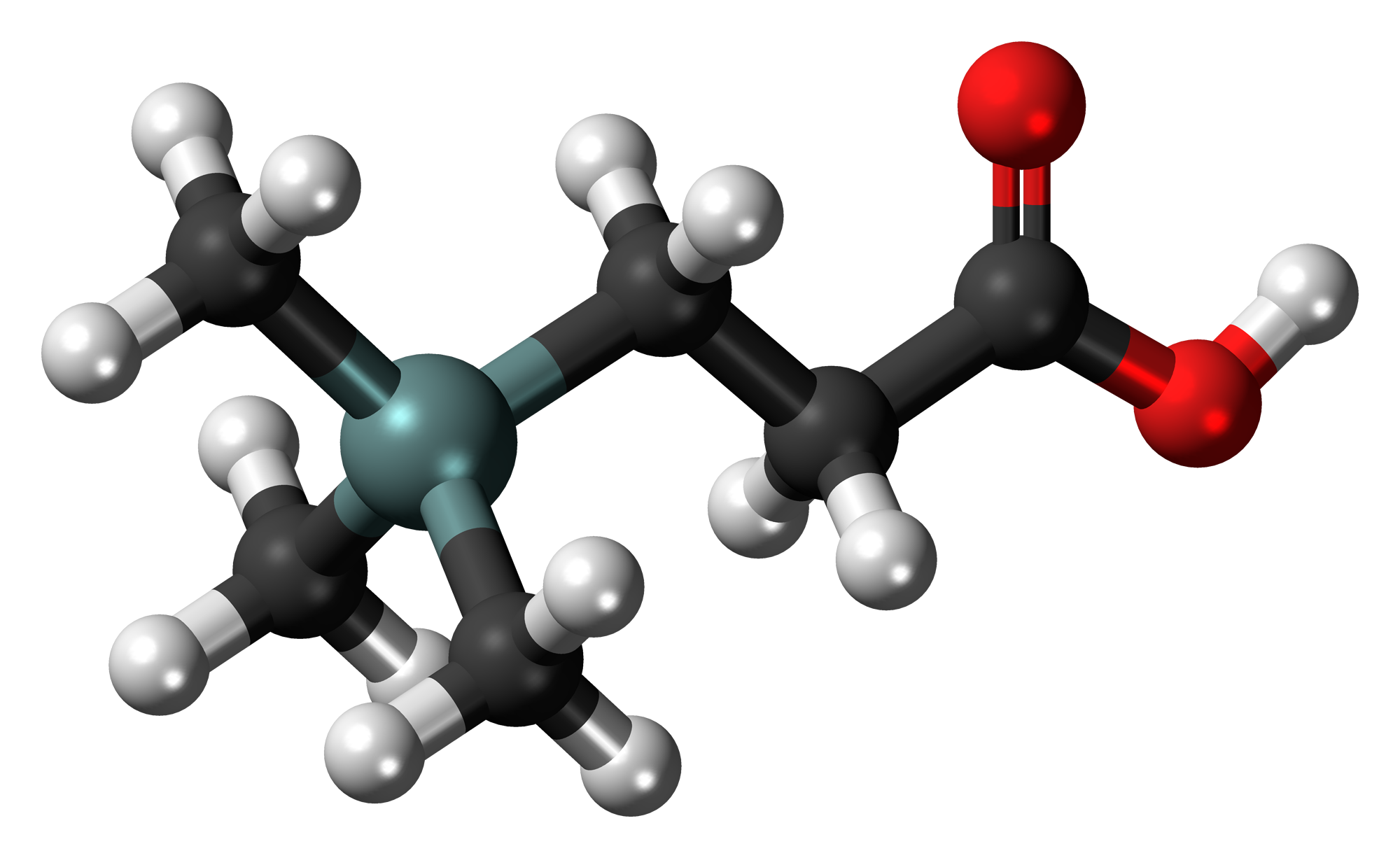

Names
- Preferred IUPAC name 3-(Trimethylsilyl)propanoic acid
- Other names 3-Trimethylsilylpropanoate; 3-(Trimethylsilyl)propionic acid; 2,2-Dimethyl-2-silapentan-5-oic acid

Identifiers
CAS Number	5683-30-7
3D model (JSmol)	Interactive image
ChEBI	CHEBI:85487
ChemSpider	72062
ECHA InfoCard	100.024.678
PubChem CID	79764
UNII	X8H75Z8P93
CompTox Dashboard (EPA)	DTXSID7063978
- InChI: InChI=1S/C6H14O2Si/c1-9(2,3)5-4-6(7)8/h4-5H2,1-3H3,(H,7,8)
- SMILES: O=C(O)CC[Si](C)(C)C

Properties
Chemical formula	C_{6}H_{14}O_{2}Si (acid), C_{6}H_{13}O_{2}Si^{−} (anion)
Molar mass	146.26 g/mol (acid), 145.25 g/mol (anion), 172.27 g/mol (sodium salt of deuterated molecule)
Appearance	Colorless liquid
- Except where otherwise noted, data are given for materials in their standard state (at 25 °C [77 °F], 100 kPa). Infobox references

Trimethylsilylpropanoic acid (TMSP or TSP) is a chemical compound containing a trimethylsilyl group. It is used as internal reference in nuclear magnetic resonance for aqueous solvents (e.g. D_{2}O). For that use it is often deuterated (3-(trimethylsilyl)-2,2,3,3-tetradeuteropropionic acid or TMSP-d_{4}). Other internal references that are frequently used in NMR experiments are DSS and tetramethylsilane.

Deuterated TMSP sodium salt
