= John Markley =

American biochemist

John L. Markley is an American biochemist.

Markley focuses on NMR spectroscopy and its biological applications, structure function relationships in proteins, stable-isotope-assisted multinuclear magnetic resonance spectroscopy, processing and analysis of multi-dimensional NMR data; structural genomics and metabolomics.

Marley is currently the Steenbock Professor of Biomolecular Structure at the University of Wisconsin–Madison and an Elected Fellow of the American Association for the Advancement of Science.

== Research publications ==
2020	Dashti H, Westler WM, Wedell JR, Demler OV, Eghbalnia HR, Markley JL, Mora S. Probabilistic identification of saccharide moieties in biomolecules and their protein complexes. Scientific Data. 7: 210. PMID 32620933 DOI: 10.1038/s41597-020-0547-y
2020	Aceti DJ, Ahmed H, Westler WM, Wu C, Dashti H, Tonelli M, Eghbalnia H, Amarasinghe GK, Markley JL. Fragment screening targeting Ebola virus nucleoprotein C-terminal domain identifies lead candidates. Antiviral Research. 104822. PMID 32446802 DOI: 10.1016/j.antiviral.2020.104822
2020	Alhajala HS, Markley JL, Kim JH, Al-Gizawiy MM, Schmainda KM, Kuo JS, Chitambar CR. The cytotoxicity of gallium maltolate in glioblastoma cells is enhanced by metformin through combined action on mitochondrial complex 1. Oncotarget. 11: 1531-1544. PMID 32391122 DOI: 10.18632/oncotarget.27567
2020	Cai K, Frederick RO, Markley JL. 2mISCU interacts with NFU1, and ISCU[4Fe-4S] transfers its Fe-S cluster to NFU1 leading to the production of holo-NFU1. Journal of Structural Biology. 107491. PMID 32151725 DOI: 10.1016/j.jsb.2020.107491
2020	Barnett BR, Fathi F, Falco Cobra P, Yi SY, Anderson JM, Eghbalnia HR, Markley JL, Yu JJ. Metabolic Changes in Synaptosomes in an Animal Model of Schizophrenia Revealed by H and H,C NMR Spectroscopy. Metabolites. 10. PMID 32102223 DOI: 10.3390/metabo10020079
2020	Romero PR, Kobayashi N, Wedell JR, Baskaran K, Iwata T, Yokochi M, Maziuk D, Yao H, Fujiwara T, Kurusu G, Ulrich EL, Hoch JC, Markley JL. BioMagResBank (BMRB) as a Resource for Structural Biology. Methods in Molecular Biology. 2112: 187-218. PMID 32006287 DOI: 10.1007/978-1-0716-0270-6_14
2020	Weber DK, Wang S, Markley JL, Veglia G, Lee W. PISA-SPARKY: an interactive SPARKY plugin to analyze oriented solid-state NMR spectra of helical membrane proteins. Bioinformatics. PMID 31930377 DOI: 10.1093/bioinformatics/btaa019
2020	Tanrikulu IC, Westler WM, Ellison AJ, Markley JL, Raines RT. Templated Collagen "Double Helices" Maintain Their Structure. Journal of the American Chemical Society. PMID 31895554 DOI: 10.1021/jacs.9b07583
2020	Lee W, Tonelli M, Frederick RO, Haruta M, Cornilescu G, Cornilescu CC, Sussman MR, Markley JL. Solution Structure Determination of Arabidopsis Thaliana RALF8 Illustrates the use of Cutting-Edge Software Developed at the National Magnetic Resonance Facility at Madison Biophysical Journal. 118: 62a. DOI: 10.1016/j.bpj.2019.11.514
2019	Bortnov V, Tonelli M, Lee W, Lin Z, Annis DS, Demerdash ON, Bateman A, Mitchell JC, Ge Y, Markley JL, Mosher DF. Solution structure of human myeloid-derived growth factor suggests a conserved function in the endoplasmic reticulum. Nature Communications. 10: 5612. PMID 31819058 DOI: 10.1038/s41467-019-13577-5
