= DSS (NMR standard) =

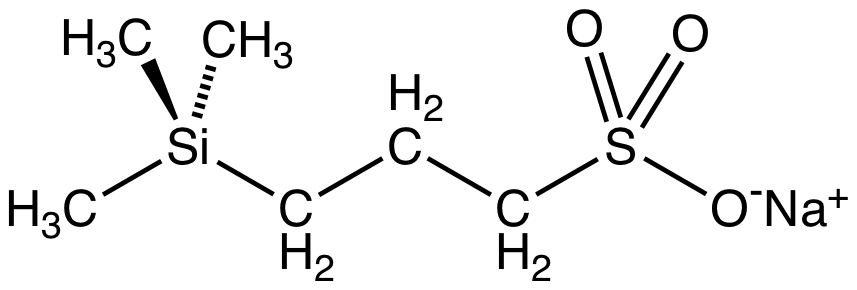

Names
- Preferred IUPAC name Sodium 3-(trimethylsilyl)propane-1-sulfonate
- Other names 3-trimethylsilyl-1-propanesulfonate, sodium salt; 2,2-Dimethyl-2-silapentane-5-sulfonate sodium salt; DSS sodium salt(trimethylsilyl)-1-propanesulfonate

Identifiers
CAS Number	2039-96-5
3D model (JSmol)	Interactive image
Abbreviations	DSS
ChemSpider	67436
ECHA InfoCard	100.016.393
EC Number	218-031-5
PubChem CID	5167273
UNII	996MF68A8L
CompTox Dashboard (EPA)	DTXSID7062118
- InChI: InChI=1S/C6H16O3SSi.Na/c1-11(2,3)6-4-5-10(7,8)9;/h4-6H2,1-3H3,(H,7,8,9);/q;+1/p-1 Key: HWEXKRHYVOGVDA-UHFFFAOYSA-M
- SMILES: C[Si](C)(C)CCCS(=O)(=O)[O-].[Na+]

Properties
Chemical formula	C_{6}H_{15}NaO_{3}SSi
Molar mass	218.32 g·mol^{−1}
Appearance	White solid
- Except where otherwise noted, data are given for materials in their standard state (at 25 °C [77 °F], 100 kPa). Infobox references

Sodium trimethylsilylpropanesulfonate (DSS) is the organosilicon compound with the formula (CH_{3})_{3}SiCH_{2}CH_{2}CH_{2}SO_{3}^{−}Na^{+}. It is the sodium salt of trimethylsilylpropanesulfonic acid. A white, water-soluble solid, it is used as a chemical shift standard for proton NMR spectroscopy of aqueous solutions. The chemical shift, specifically the signal for the trimethylsilyl group, is relatively insensitive to pH.

The proton spectrum of DSS also exhibits resonances at 2.91 ppm (m), 1.75 ppm (m), and 0.63 ppm (m) at an intensity of 22% of the reference resonance at 0 ppm.

== Alternatives ==
Sodium trimethylsilyl propionate (TSP) is a related compound used as an NMR standard. It uses a carboxylic acid instead of the sulfonic acid found in DSS to confer water solubility. As a weak acid, TSP is more sensitive to changes in pH.

4,4-Dimethyl-4-silapentane-1-ammonium trifluoroacetate (DSA) has also been proposed as an alternative, to overcome certain drawbacks of DSS.
