= Deuterated solvent =

Deuterated chloroform

Deuterated solvents are a group of compounds where one or more hydrogen atoms are substituted by deuterium atoms.

These isotopologues of common solvents are often used in nuclear magnetic resonance spectroscopy.

== Examples ==
- Heavy water
- Deuterated acetone
- Deuterated benzene
- Deuterated chloroform
- Deuterated dichloromethane
- Deuterated DMF
- Deuterated DMSO
- Deuterated ethanol
- Deuterated methanol
- Deuterated THF
