= Receptivity (NMR) =

Scientific term

In NMR spectroscopy, receptivity refers to the relative detectability of a particular element. Some elements are easily detected, some less so. The receptivity is a function of the abundance of the element's NMR-responsive isotope and that isotope's gyromagnetic ratio (or equivalently, the nuclear magnetic moment). Some isotopes, tritium for example, have large gyromagnetic ratios but low abundance. Other isotopes, for example ^{103}Rh, are highly abundant but have low gyromagnetic ratios. Widely used NMR spectroscopies often focus on highly receptive elements: ^{1}H, ^{19}F, and ^{31}P.

Receptivity of Selected Spin 1/2 Nuclei
Isotope	Natural abundance (%)	Magnetogyric ratio (10^{7} rad⋅s^{−1}⋅T^{−1})	Receptivity vs ^{13}C (R_{C})
^{3}H	0	28.5	-
^{1}H	99	26.8	5700
^{13}C	1.11	6.7	1
^{19}F	100	25.1	4700
^{31}P	100	10.8	377
^{77}Se	7.58	5.10	3.0
^{103}Rh	100	-0.84	0.18
