= Dichloromethane (data page) =

Chemical data page

Please find below supplementary chemical data about dichloromethane.

== MSDS sheets ==
The handling of this chemical may incur notable safety precautions. It is highly recommended that you seek the Material Safety Datasheet (MSDS) for this chemical from a reliable source and follow its directions.

- Sigma-Aldrich

== Structure and properties ==
Structure and properties
Index of refraction, n_{D}	1.4242
Abbe number	?
Dielectric constant, ε_{r}	9.08 ε_{0} at 20 °C
Dipole moment,	1.62 D
Bond strength	?
Bond length	?
Bond angle	?
Magnetic susceptibility	?
Surface tension	26.52 dyn/cm at 20 °C
Viscosity	0.449 mPa·s at 15 °C; 0.393 mPa·s at 30 °C

== Thermodynamic properties ==
Phase behavior
Triple point	? K (? °C), ? Pa
Critical point	510 K (237 °C), 6100 kPa
Std enthalpy change of fusion, Δ_{fus}H^{~~o~~}	+6.160 kJ/mol
Std entropy change of fusion, Δ_{fus}S^{~~o~~}	? J/(mol·K)
Std enthalpy change of vaporization, Δ_{vap}H^{~~o~~}	28.6 kJ/mol
Std entropy change of vaporization, Δ_{vap}S^{~~o~~}	91.43 J/(mol·K)
Solid properties
Std enthalpy change of formation, Δ_{f}H^{~~o~~}_{solid}	? kJ/mol
Standard molar entropy, S^{~~o~~}_{solid}	? J/(mol K)
Heat capacity, c_{p}	? J/(mol K)
Liquid properties
Std enthalpy change of formation, Δ_{f}H^{~~o~~}_{liquid}	−124.3 kJ/mol
Standard molar entropy, S^{~~o~~}_{liquid}	174.5 J/(mol K)
Heat capacity, c_{p}	102.3 J/(mol K)
Gas properties
Std enthalpy change of formation, Δ_{f}H^{~~o~~}_{gas}	−95.52 kJ/mol
Standard molar entropy, S^{~~o~~}_{gas}	270.28 J/(mol K)
Heat capacity, c_{p}	? J/(mol K)
van der Waals' constants	a = 1244 L^{2} kPa/mol^{2} b = 0.08689 liter per mole

== Vapor pressure of liquid ==
P in mm Hg	1	10	40	100	400	760
T in °C	–70.0	–43.3	–22.3	–6.3	24.1	40.7

Table data obtained from CRC Handbook of Chemistry and Physics 47th ed.

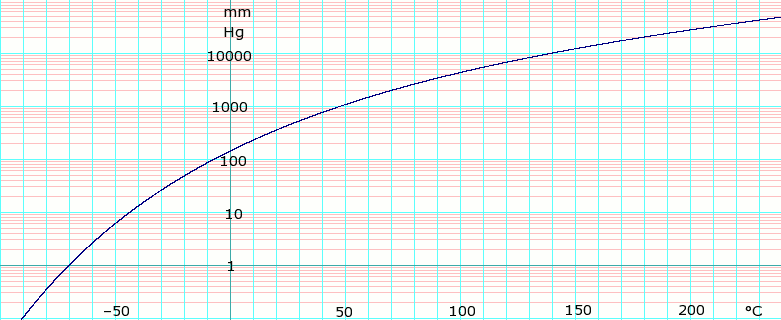
log_{10} of Dichloromethane vapor pressure. Uses formula: $\scriptstyle \log_e P_{mmHg} =$$\scriptstyle \log_e (\frac {760} {101.325}) - 10.08632\log_e(T+273.15) - \frac {6030.610} {T+273.15} + 80.87786 + 9.812512 \times 10^{-6} (T+273.15)^2$ obtained from CHERIC

== Spectral data ==
UV-Vis
Spectrum	?
Lambda-max	? nm
Log Ε	?
IR
Spectrum	NIST
Major absorption bands	? cm^{−1}
NMR
Proton NMR	δ CDCl_{3} 5.30 (s, 2H)
Carbon-13 NMR	δ CDCl_{3} 53.5
Other NMR data	?
MS
Masses of main fragments	?

== Structure and properties data ==
Structure and properties
Index of refraction	1.424
Dielectric constant	8.93
Viscosity	0.44 cP at 20 °C

This box:
- Except where noted otherwise, data relate to Standard temperature and pressure.
- Reliability of data general note.
