= Tetrahydrofuran (data page) =

Chemical data page

This page provides supplementary chemical data on tetrahydrofuran.

== Material Safety Data Sheet ==
The handling of this chemical may incur notable safety precautions. It is highly recommend that you seek the Material Safety Datasheet (MSDS) for this chemical from a reliable source such as SIRI, and follow its directions. MSDS is available at Mallinckrodt Baker.

== Structure and properties ==
Structure and properties
Index of refraction, n_{D}	1.4040 at 25°C
Abbe number	?
Dielectric constant, ε_{r}	7.52 ε_{0} at 22 °C
Bond strength	?
Bond length	?
Bond angle	?
Magnetic susceptibility	?
Viscosity	0.456 mPa·s at 25°C

== Thermodynamic properties ==
Phase behavior
Triple point	164.76 K (−108.39 °C), ? Pa
Critical point	541 K (268 °C), 5190 kPa
Std enthalpy change of fusion, Δ_{fus}H^{~~o~~}	8.540 kJ/mol
Std entropy change of fusion, Δ_{fus}S^{~~o~~}	51.8 J/(mol·K)
Std enthalpy change of vaporization, Δ_{vap}H^{~~o~~}	32 kJ/mol
Std entropy change of vaporization, Δ_{vap}S^{~~o~~}	51.8 J/(mol·K)
Solid properties
Std enthalpy change of formation, Δ_{f}H^{~~o~~}_{solid}	? kJ/mol
Standard molar entropy, S^{~~o~~}_{solid}	? J/(mol K)
Heat capacity, c_{p}	81.65 J/(mol K) at −108.39°C
Liquid properties
Std enthalpy change of formation, Δ_{f}H^{~~o~~}_{liquid}	? kJ/mol
Standard molar entropy, S^{~~o~~}_{liquid}	203.8 J/(mol K)
Enthalpy of combustion, Δ_{c}H^{~~o~~}	−2501.2 kJ/mol
Heat capacity, c_{p}	107.4 J/(mol K) at −108.39 °C 123.9 J/(mol K) at 25°C
Gas properties
Std enthalpy change of formation, Δ_{f}H^{~~o~~}_{gas}	−184.2 kJ/mol
Standard molar entropy, S^{~~o~~}_{gas}	301.7 J/(mol K)
Heat capacity, c_{p}	76.6 J/(mol K) at 25°C

== Vapor pressure of liquid ==
Vapor pressure 143 mm Hg at 20°C

P in mBar	9.9	19.5	36.3	63.9	107	173	268	402	586	831	1013
T in °C	−30	−20	−10	0	10	20	30	40	50	60	66

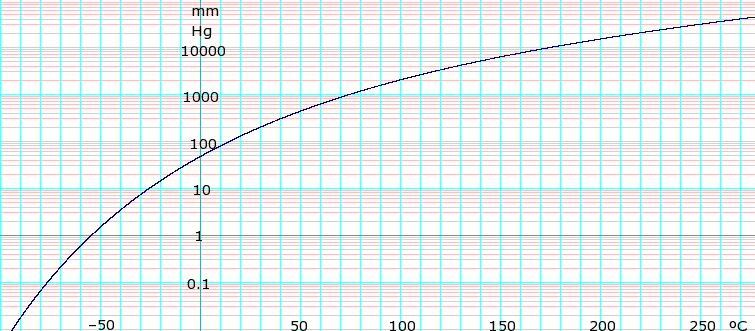
log_{10} Tetrahydrofuran vapor pressure. Uses formula: $\scriptstyle \log_e P_{mmHg} =$$\scriptstyle \log_e (\frac {760} {101.325}) - 9.608804 \log_e(T+273.15) - \frac {6339.983} {T+273.15} + 78.35769 + 8.183476 \times 10^{-06} (T+273.15)^2$ obtained from CHERIC

== Distillation data ==
Vapor-Liquid Equilibrium of Tetrahydrofuran/Ethanol; P = 100 kPa
BP Temp. °C	% by mole THF
BP Temp. °C	liquid	vapor
78.	0.00	0.00
77.4	1.72	3.69
76.2	5.36	11.5
73.8	13.9	26.4
71.0	26.3	42.8
67.7	49.7	62.8
67.2	54.3	65.4
65.9	71.5	76.2
65.4	85.7	86.5
65.2	90.8	90.8
65.4	91.8	91.48
65.4	94.99	94.46
65.5	98.15	97.9
65.6	100.0	100.0

== Spectral data ==
UV-Vis
λ_{max}	? nm
Extinction coefficient, ε	?
IR
Major absorption bands	? cm^{−1}
NMR
Proton NMR
Carbon-13 NMR
Other NMR data
MS
Masses of main fragments

This box:
- Except where noted otherwise, data relate to Standard temperature and pressure.
- Reliability of data general note.
