= Fluorine-19 nuclear magnetic resonance spectroscopy =

Analytical technique

A sample 19F NMR spectrum of a simple organic compound. Integrations are shown under each peak.

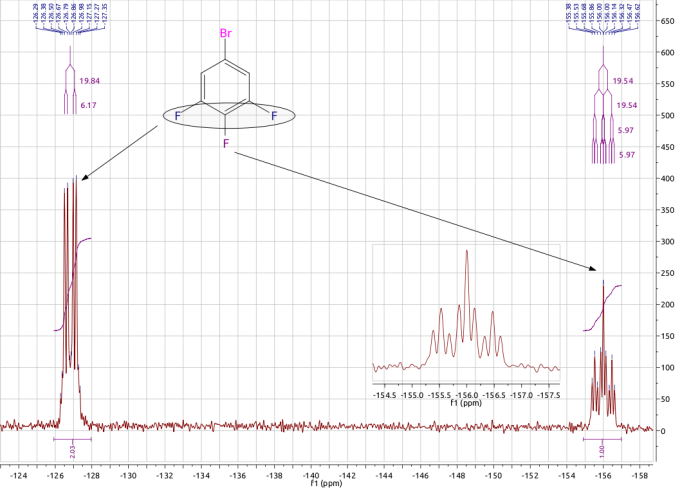
19F NMR spectrum of 1-bromo-3,4,5-trifluorobenzene. The expansion shows the spin–spin coupling pattern arising from the para-fluorine coupling to the 2 meta-fluorine and 2 ortho proton nuclei.

Fluorine-19 nuclear magnetic resonance spectroscopy (fluorine NMR or ^{19}F NMR) is an analytical technique used to detect and identify fluorine-containing compounds. ^{19}F is an important nucleus for NMR spectroscopy because of its receptivity and large chemical shift dispersion, which is greater than that for proton nuclear magnetic resonance spectroscopy.

== Operational details ==
^{19}F has a nuclear spin (I) of 1/2 and a high gyromagnetic ratio. Consequently, this isotope is highly responsive to NMR measurements. Furthermore, ^{19}F comprises 100% of naturally occurring fluorine. The only other highly sensitive spin 1/2 NMR-active nuclei that are monoisotopic (or nearly so) are ^{1}H and ^{31}P. (Note: The nuclei ^{89}Y, ^{103}Rh and ^{169}Tm are also monoisotopic and spin 1/2, but have very low magnetogyric ratios.) Indeed, the ^{19}F nucleus is the third most receptive NMR nucleus, after the ^{3}H nucleus and ^{1}H nucleus.

The ^{19}F NMR chemical shifts span a range of about 800 ppm. For organofluorine compounds the range is narrower, being about −50 to −70 ppm (for CF_{3} groups) to −200 to −220 ppm (for CH_{2}F groups). The very wide spectral range can cause problems in recording spectra, such as poor data resolution and inaccurate integration.

It is also possible to record decoupled ^{19}F{^{1}H} and ^{1}H{^{19}F} spectra and multiple bond correlations ^{19}F-^{13}C HMBC and through space HOESY spectra.

== Chemical shifts ==
^{19}F NMR chemical shifts in the literature vary strongly, commonly by over 1 ppm, even within the same solvent. Although the reference compound for ^{19}F NMR spectroscopy, neat CFCl_{3} (0 ppm), has been used since the 1950s, clear instructions on how to measure and deploy it in routine measurements were not present until recently. An investigation of the factors influencing the chemical shift in fluorine NMR spectroscopy revealed the solvent to have the largest effect (Δδ = ±2 ppm or more). A solvent-specific reference table with 5 internal reference compounds has been prepared (CFCl_{3}, C_{6}H_{5}F, PhCF_{3}, C_{6}F_{6} and CF_{3}CO_{2}H) to allow reproducible referencing with an accuracy of Δδ = ±30 ppb. As the chemical shift of CFCl_{3} is also affected by the solvent, care must be taken when using dissolved CFCl_{3} as reference compound with regards to the chemical shift of neat CFCl_{3} (0 ppm). Example of chemical shifts determined against neat CFCl_{3}:

Excerpt of referencing table against neat CFCl_{3} [ppm]
| | CFCl_{3} | C_{6}H_{5}F | PhCF_{3} | C_{6}F_{6} | CF_{3}CO_{2}H |
|---|---|---|---|---|---|
| Solvent | [ppm] | [ppm] | [ppm] | [ppm] | [ppm] |
| CDCl_{3} | 0.65 | −112.96 | −62.61 | −161.64 | −75.39 |
| CD_{2}Cl_{2} | 0.02 | −113.78 | −62.93 | −162.61 | −75.76 |
| C_{6}D_{6} | −0.19 | −113.11 | −62.74 | −163.16 | −75.87 |
| Acetone-d_{6} | −1.09 | −114.72 | −63.22 | −164.67 | −76.87 |

For a complete list the reference compounds chemical shifts in 11 deuterated solvents the reader is referred to the cited literature.

A concise list of appropriately referenced chemical shifts of over 240 fluorinated chemicals has also been recently provided.

=== Chemical shift prediction ===
^{19}F NMR chemical shifts are more difficult to predict than ^{1}H NMR shifts. Specifically, ^{19}F NMR shifts are strongly affected by contributions from electronic excited states whereas ^{1}H NMR shifts are dominated by diamagnetic contributions.

=== Fluoromethyl compounds ===
^{19}F chemical shifts of F_{3}C−R groups
| −R | δ (ppm) |
|---|---|
| H | −78 |
| CH_{3} | −62 |
| CH_{2}CH_{3} | −70 |
| CH_{2}NH_{2} | −72 |
| CH_{2}OH | −78 |
| CH=CH_{2} | −67 |
| C≡CH | −56 |
| CF_{3} | −89 |
| CF_{2}CF_{3} | −83 |
| F | −63 |
| Cl | −29 |
| Br | −18 |
| I | −5 |
| OH | −55 |
| NH_{2} | −49 |
| SH | −32 |
| C(=O)Ph | −58 |
| C(=O)CF_{3} | −85 |
| C(=O)OH | −77 |
| C(=O)F | −76 |
| C(=O)OCH_{2}CH_{3} | −74 |

^{19}F chemical shifts of F_{2}CH−R groups
| −R | δ (ppm) |
|---|---|
| H | −144 |
| CH_{3} | −110 |
| CH_{2}CH_{3} | −120 |
| CF_{3} | −141 |
| CF_{2}CF_{3} | −138 |
| C(=O)OH | −127 |

^{19}F chemical shifts of FH_{2}C−R groups
| −R | δ (ppm) |
|---|---|
| H | −268 |
| CH_{3} | −212 |
| CH_{2}CH_{3} | −212 |
| CH_{2}OH | −226 |
| CF_{3} | −241 |
| CF_{2}CF_{3} | −243 |
| C(=O)OH | −229 |

=== Fluoroalkenes ===
For vinylic fluorine substituents, the following formula allows estimation of ^{19}F chemical shifts:
$$\delta_{C=CF}~[\text{ppm}] = -133.9 + Z_\text{cis} + Z_\text{trans} + Z_\text{gem} + S_\text{cis/trans} + S_\text{cis/gem} + S_\text{trans/gem},$$
where Z is the statistical substituent chemical shift (SSCS) for the substituent in the listed position, and S is the interaction factor. Some representative values for use in this equation are provided in the table below:

SSCS values for fluoroalkene substituents
| Substituent R | Z_{cis} | Z_{trans} | Z_{gem} |
|---|---|---|---|
| −H | −7.4 | −31.3 | 49.9 |
| −CH_{3} | −6.0 | −43.0 | 9.5 |
| −CH=CH_{2} | — | — | 47.7 |
| −Ph | −15.7 | −35.1 | 38.7 |
| −CF_{3} | −25.3 | −40.7 | 54.3 |
| −F | 0 | 0 | 0 |
| −Cl | −16.5 | −29.4 | — |
| −Br | −17.7 | −40.0 | — |
| −I | −21.3 | −46.3 | 17.4 |
| −OCH_{2}CH_{3} | −77.5 | — | 84.2 |

Interaction factors for fluoroalkene substituents
| Substituent | Substituent | S_{cis/trans} | S_{cis/gem} | S_{trans/gem} |
|---|---|---|---|---|
| −H | −H | −26.6 | — | 2.8 |
| −H | −CF_{3} | −21.3 | — | — |
| −H | −CH_{3} | — | 11.4 | — |
| −H | −OCH_{2}CH_{3} | −47.0 | — | — |
| −H | −Ph | −4.8 | — | 5.2 |
| −CF_{3} | −H | −7.5 | −10.6 | 12.5 |
| −CF_{3} | −CF_{3} | −5.9 | −5.3 | −4.7 |
| −CF_{3} | −CH_{3} | 17.0 | — | — |
| −CF_{3} | −Ph | −15.6 | — | −23.4 |
| −CH_{3} | −H | — | −12.2 | — |
| −CH_{3} | −CF_{3} | — | −13.8 | −8.9 |
| −CH_{3} | −Ph | — | −19.5 | −19.5 |
| −OCH_{2}CH_{3} | −H | −5.1 | — | — |
| −Ph | −H | — | — | 20.1 |
| −Ph | −CF_{3} | −23.2 | — | — |

=== Fluorobenzenes ===
When determining the ^{19}F chemical shifts of aromatic fluorine atoms, specifically phenyl fluorides, there is another equation that allows for an approximation. Adopted from "Structure Determination of Organic Compounds," this equation is
$$\delta_F~[\text{ppm}] = -113.9 + \Sigma Z_\text{ortho} + \Sigma Z_\text{meta} + \Sigma Z_\text{para},$$
where Z is the SSCS value for a substituent in a given position relative to the fluorine atom. Some representative values for use in this equation are provided in the table below:

SSCS values for fluorobenzene substituents
| Substituent | Z_{ortho} | Z_{meta} | Z_{para} |
|---|---|---|---|
| −CH_{3} | −3.9 | −0.4 | −3.6 |
| −CH=CH_{2} | −4.4 | 0.7 | −0.6 |
| −F | −23.2 | 2.0 | −6.6 |
| −Cl | −0.3 | 3.5 | −0.7 |
| −Br | 7.6 | 3.5 | 0.1 |
| −I | 19.9 | 3.6 | 1.4 |
| −OH | −23.5 | 0 | −13.3 |
| −OCH_{3} | −18.9 | −0.8 | −9.0 |
| −NH_{2} | −22.9 | −1.3 | −17.4 |
| −NO_{2} | −5.6 | 3.8 | 9.6 |
| −CN | 6.9 | 4.1 | 10.1 |
| −SH | 10.0 | 0.9 | −3.5 |
| −CH(=O) | −7.4 | 2.1 | 10.3 |
| −C(=O)CH_{3} | 2.5 | 1.8 | 7.6 |
| −C(=O)OH | 2.3 | 1.1 | 6.5 |
| −C(=O)NH_{2} | 0.5 | −0.8 | 3.4 |
| −C(=O)OCH_{3} | 3.3 | 3.8 | 7.1 |
| −C(=O)Cl | 3.4 | 3.5 | 12.9 |

The data shown above are only representative of some trends and molecules. Other sources and data tables can be consulted for a more comprehensive list of trends in ^{19}F chemical shifts. Something to note is that, historically, most literature sources switched the convention of using negatives. Therefore, be wary of the sign of values reported in other sources.

== Spin–spin coupling ==
^{19}F-^{19}F coupling constants are generally larger than ^{1}H-^{1}H coupling constants. Long range ^{19}F-^{19}F coupling, (^{2}J, ^{3}J, ^{4}J or even ^{5}J) are commonly observed. Generally, the longer range the coupling, the smaller the value. Hydrogen couples with fluorine, which is very typical to see in ^{19}F spectrum. With a geminal hydrogen, the coupling constants can be as large as 50 Hz. Other nuclei can couple with fluorine, however, this can be prevented by running decoupled experiments. It is common to run fluorine NMRs with both carbon and proton decoupled. Fluorine atoms can also couple with each other. Between fluorine atoms, homonuclear coupling constants are much larger than with hydrogen atoms. Geminal fluorines usually have a J-value of 250-300 Hz. There are many good references for coupling constant values. The citations are included below.

== Biochemical and medical applications ==
Fluorine-19 has often been employed to examine the structure and dynamics of fluorine-labeled proteins. The following fluorinated amino acids have been incorporated into proteins: 3- and 4-fluorophenylalanine, 6- and 5-fluorotryptophan and 3-fluorotyrosine, 5-fluoroleucine, trifluoroethylglycine, trifluoro- and difluoromethionine, and 2-fluorohistidine. Substitution, mediated often ribosomally, is facilitated because H and F are similar in size, even though C-F bonds are somewhat longer.

=== In vivo magnetic resonance spectroscopy and imaging (^{19}F MRS / MRI) ===
In vivo magnetic resonance spectroscopy is a technique that closely resembles the laboratory NMR, but the sample is contained within a living organism (in vivo). In turn, magnetic resonance imaging is more complex technique that can provide the spatial distribution of the study MR signal throughout the body. Most commonly, MRI acquires ^{1}H signal, but it can also acquire any other nuclide with non-zero spin number.

Natural fluorine is monoisotopic - its only non-radioactive nuclide (^{19}F) has spin number 1/2 and a very high gyromagnetic ratio (ca. 93% of that of ^{1}H). Because of this, ^{19}F MRS/MRI can be acquired relatively easily even with the same hardware as ^{1}H MRS/MRI.

The natural fluorine background in the body is negligible; most of the body's fluorine is found in teeth and bones, where it has very short T_{2} relaxation times and so is virtually invisible to most ^{19}F MRI/MRS techniques. For this reason, ^{19}F MRI/MRS suffers from no background interference and can be used to monitor fluorinated xenobiotics (artificial compounds).

In vivo ^{19}F MRI/MRS are not common techniques, but these methods can both quantify and locate the fluorinated drug, as well as differentiate its metabolic states. For example, it has been used to study in vivo pharmacokinetics and metabolism of 5-fluorouracil. The estimates of biological half-life of fleroxacin using in vivo ^{19}F MRS (14.2 ± 2.4) were well in line with those determined with other methods. A fluorinated polymer poly(2,2-difluoroethyl)acrylamide showed a biological half-life ≈200 days using in vivo ^{19}F MRS, in line with estimated provides with in vivo fluorescence imaging (150 ± 20 days). Analogously, ^{19}F MRS/MRI has been used to track the in vivo degradation of fluorinated materials.
