= Carbon-13 NMR satellite =

Type of nuclear magnetic resonance peak

Carbon satellites in physics and spectroscopy, are small peaks that can be seen shouldering the main peaks in the nuclear magnetic resonance (NMR) spectrum. These peaks can occur in the NMR spectrum of any NMR active atom (e.g. ^{19}F or ^{31}P NMR) where those atoms adjoin a carbon atom (and where the spectrum is not ^{13}C-decoupled, which is usually the case). However, Carbon satellites are most often encountered in proton NMR.

In the example of proton NMR, these peaks are not the result of proton-proton coupling, but result from the coupling of ^{1}H atoms to an adjoining ^{13}C atom. These small peaks are known as carbon satellites as they are small and appear around the main ^{1}H peak i.e. satellite (around) to them. Carbon satellites are small because ^{13}C only makes up about 1% of the atomic carbon content of carbon, the rest of the carbon atoms are predominantly NMR inactive ^{12}C. Carbon satellites always appear as an evenly spaced pair around the main ^{1}H peak. This is because they are the result of 1% of the ^{1}H atoms coupling to an adjoined ^{13}C atom to give a wide doublet (^{13}C has a spin of a half). Note, if the main ^{1}H-peak has proton-proton coupling, then each satellite will be a miniature version of the main peak and will also show this ^{1}H-coupling, e.g. if the main ^{1}H-peak is a doublet, then the carbon satellites will appear as miniature doublets, i.e. one doublet on either side of the main ^{1}H-peak.

For other NMR atoms (e.g. ^{19}F or ^{31}P atoms), the same applies as above, but obviously where the proton atom is replaced with that other NMR active atom e.g. ^{31}P.

Sometime other peaks can be seen around ^{1}H peaks; these are known as spinning sidebands and are related to the rate of spin of an NMR tube. Carbon satellites (and spinning sidebands) should not be confused with impurity peaks.

== Uses ==
cis-Stilbene

trans-Stilbene

Carbon satellites can be used to obtain structural information, which is not available by looking at the main peaks in the NMR spectrum.

This usually occurs when the purely ^{12}C compound is symmetrical but where the 1% of the compound which has a ^{13}C atom in it is no longer symmetrical.

For example, it is not possible to tell whether stilbene (Ph-CH=CH-Ph) has a cis- or trans- double bond just by examining at the main peaks in the ^{1}H NMR spectrum. The =CH- proton does not couple to the adjacent =CH- proton as the molecule is symmetrical. However, 1% of the stilbene molecules will have a ^{13}C atom on one of these double bond carbons (i.e. Ph-^{13}CH=^{12}CH-Ph). In this situation, the proton adjacent to ^{13}C atom will couple to the ^{13}C atom to give a wide doublet. Also, as this molecule is no longer symmetric the ^{13}CH= proton will now couple to the adjacent ^{12}CH= proton, causing a further doubleting. Thus, this additional coupling (additional to the ^{13}C coupling) is diagnostic of the type of double bond, and will allow one to determine if the stilbene molecule has a cis- or trans- configuration i.e. by examining the size of the diagnostic J coupling constant from -CH=CH- bond. Thus, only a single ^{1}H NMR spectrum is needed, albeit with close inspection of the satellite peaks, rather than any further complex NMR or derivative chemical experiments.

The same would be seen for 1,2-dichloroethene.

== See also ==
- ^{1}H NMR
- ^{13}C NMR
