= Nuclear magnetic resonance decoupling =

Nuclear magnetic resonance decoupling (NMR decoupling for short) is a special method used in nuclear magnetic resonance (NMR) spectroscopy where a sample to be analyzed is irradiated at a certain frequency or frequency range to eliminate or partially the effect of coupling between certain nuclei. NMR coupling refers to the effect of nuclei on each other in atoms within a couple of bonds distance of each other in molecules. This effect causes NMR signals in a spectrum to be split into multiple peaks. Decoupling fully or partially eliminates splitting of the signal between the nuclei irradiated and other nuclei such as the nuclei being analyzed in a certain spectrum. NMR spectroscopy and sometimes decoupling can help determine structures of chemical compounds.

== Explanation ==
NMR spectroscopy of a sample produces an NMR spectrum, which is essentially a graph of signal intensity on the vertical axis vs. chemical shift for a certain isotope on the horizontal axis. The signal intensity is dependent on the number of exactly equivalent nuclei in the sample at that chemical shift. NMR spectra are taken to analyze one isotope of nuclei at a time. Only certain types of isotopes of certain elements show up in NMR spectra. Only these isotopes cause NMR coupling. Nuclei of atoms having the same equivalent positions within a molecule also do not couple with each other. ^{1}H (proton) NMR spectroscopy and ^{13}C NMR spectroscopy analyze ^{1}H and ^{13}C nuclei, respectively, and are the most common types (most common analyte isotopes which show signals) of NMR spectroscopy.

Homonuclear decoupling is when the nuclei being radio frequency (rf) irradiated are the same isotope as the nuclei being observed (analyzed) in the spectrum. Heteronuclear decoupling is when the nuclei being rf irradiated are of a different isotope than the nuclei being observed in the spectrum. For a given isotope, the entire range for all nuclei of that isotope can be irradiated in broad band decoupling, or only a select range for certain nuclei of that isotope can be irradiated.

Practically all naturally occurring hydrogen (H) atoms have ^{1}H nuclei, which show up in ^{1}H NMR spectra. These ^{1}H nuclei are often coupled with nearby non-equivalent ^{1}H atomic nuclei within the same molecule. H atoms are most commonly bonded to carbon (C) atoms in organic compounds. About 99% of naturally occurring C atoms have ^{12}C nuclei, which neither show up in NMR spectroscopy nor couple with other nuclei which do show signals. About 1% of naturally occurring C atoms have ^{13}C nuclei, which do show signals in ^{13}C NMR spectroscopy and do couple with other active nuclei such as ^{1}H. Since the percentage of ^{13}C is so low in natural isotopic abundance samples, the ^{13}C coupling effects on other carbons and on ^{1}H are usually negligible, and for all practical purposes splitting of ^{1}H signals due to coupling with natural isotopic abundance carbon does not show up in ^{1}H NMR spectra. In real life, however, the ^{13}C coupling effect does show up on non-^{13}C decoupled spectra of other magnetic nuclei, causing satellite signals.

Similarly for all practical purposes, ^{13}C signal splitting due to coupling with nearby natural isotopic abundance carbons is negligible in ^{13}C NMR spectra. However, practically all hydrogen bonded to carbon atoms is ^{1}H in natural isotopic abundance samples, including any ^{13}C nuclei bonded to H atoms. In a ^{13}C spectrum with no decoupling at all, each of the ^{13}C signals is split according to how many H atoms that C atom is next to. In order to simplify the spectrum, ^{13}C NMR spectroscopy is most often run fully proton decoupled, meaning ^{1}H nuclei in the sample are broadly irradiated to fully decouple them from the ^{13}C nuclei being analyzed. This full proton decoupling eliminates all coupling with H atoms and thus splitting due to H atoms in natural isotopic abundance compounds. Since coupling between other carbons in natural isotopic abundance samples is negligible, signals in fully proton decoupled ^{13}C spectra in hydrocarbons and most signals from other organic compounds are single peaks. This way, the number of equivalent sets of carbon atoms in a chemical structure can be counted by counting singlet peaks, which in ^{13}C spectra tend to be very narrow (thin). Other information about the carbon atoms can usually be determined from the chemical shift, such as whether the atom is part of a carbonyl group or an aromatic ring, etc. Such full proton decoupling can also help increase the intensity of ^{13}C signals.

There can also be off-resonance decoupling of ^{1}H from ^{13}C nuclei in ^{13}C NMR spectroscopy, where weaker rf irradiation results in what can be thought of as partial decoupling. In such an off-resonance decoupled spectrum, only ^{1}H atoms bonded to a carbon atom will split its ^{13}C signal. The coupling constant, indicating a small frequency difference between split signal peaks, would be smaller than in an undecoupled spectrum. Looking at a compound's off-resonance proton-decoupled ^{13}C spectrum can show how many hydrogens are bonded to the carbon atoms to further help elucidate the chemical structure. For most organic compounds, carbons bonded to 3 hydrogens (methyls) would appear as quartets (4-peak signals), carbons bonded to 2 equivalent hydrogens would appear as triplets (3-peak signals), carbons bonded to 1 hydrogen would be doublets (2-peak signals), and carbons not bonded directly to any hydrogens would be singlets (1-peak signals).

Another decoupling method is specific proton decoupling (also called band-selective or narrowband). Here the selected "narrow" ^{1}H frequency band of the (soft) decoupling RF pulse covers only a certain part of all ^{1}H signals present in the spectrum. This can serve two purposes: (1) decreasing the deposited energy through additionally adjusting the RF pulse shapes/using composite pulses, (2) elucidating connectivities of NMR nuclei (applicable with both heteronuclear and homonuclear decoupling). Point 2 can be accomplished via decoupling e.g. of a single ^{1}H signal which then leads to the collapse of the J coupling pattern of only those observed heteronuclear or non-decoupled ^{1}H signals which are J coupled to the irradiated ^{1}H signal. Other parts of the spectrum remain unaffected. In other words this specific decoupling method is useful for signal assignments which is a crucial step for further analyses e.g. with the aim of solving a molecular structure. Note that more complex phenomena might be observed when for example the decoupled ^{1}H nuclei are exchanging with non-decoupled ^{1}H nuclei in the sample with the exchange process taking place on the NMR time scale. This is exploited e.g. with chemical exchange saturation transfer (CEST) contrast agents in in vivo magnetic resonance spectroscopy.
