= Deuterated DMSO =

- Wireframe of deuterated DMSO

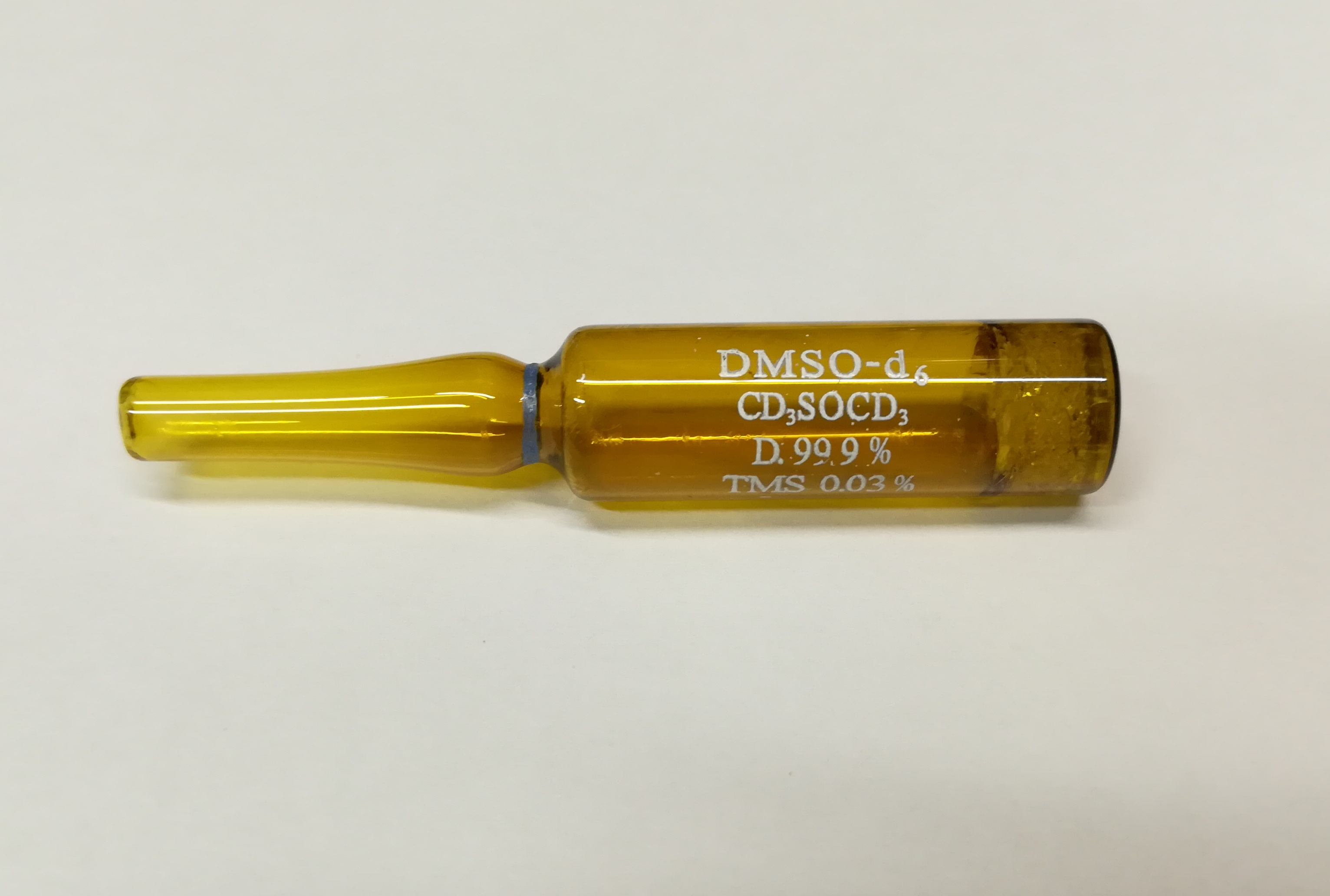

Names
- Preferred IUPAC name [(^{2}H_{3})Methanesulfinyl](^{2}H_{3})methane
- Other names Deuterated dimethyl sulfoxide, DMSO-d6

Identifiers
CAS Number	2206-27-1
3D model (JSmol)	Interactive image
Abbreviations	DMSO-d6
Beilstein Reference	1237248
ChemSpider	67699 (anhydrate)
ECHA InfoCard	100.016.925
EC Number	218-617-0
PubChem CID	75151 (anhydrate)
RTECS number	PV6210000
CompTox Dashboard (EPA)	DTXSID90944686
- InChI: InChI=1S/C2H6OS/c1-4(2)3/h1-2H3/i1D3,2D3 Key: IAZDPXIOMUYVGZ-WFGJKAKNSA-N; InChI=1S/C2H6OS/c1-4(2)3/h1-2H3/i1D3,2D3 Key: IAZDPXIOMUYVGZ-WFGJKAKNSA-N; InChI=1/C2H6OS/c1-4(2)3/h1-2H3/i1D3,2D3 Key: IAZDPXIOMUYVGZ-WFGJKAKNEE
- SMILES: [2H]C([2H])([2H])S(=O)C([2H])([2H])[2H]

Properties
Chemical formula	C_{2}D_{6}OS
Molar mass	84.17 g·mol^{-1}
Density	1.19 g/cm^{3} (20 °C)
Melting point	20.2 °C (68.4 °F; 293.3 K)
Boiling point	189 °C (372 °F; 462 K)
- Except where otherwise noted, data are given for materials in their standard state (at 25 °C [77 °F], 100 kPa). verify (what is ?) Infobox references

Deuterated DMSO, also known as dimethyl sulfoxide-d_{6}, is an isotopologue of dimethyl sulfoxide (DMSO, (CH_{3})_{2}S=O)) with chemical formula ((CD_{3})_{2}S=O) in which the hydrogen atoms ("H") are replaced with their deuterium ("D") isotope. Deuterated DMSO is a common solvent used in nuclear magnetic resonance spectroscopy (NMR).

== Production ==
Deuterated DMSO is produced by heating DMSO in heavy water (D_{2}O) with a basic catalyst such as calcium oxide. The reaction does not give complete conversion to the d_{6} product, and the water produced must be removed and replaced with D_{2}O several times to drive the equilibrium to the fully deuterated product.

== Applications ==
=== NMR spectroscopy ===
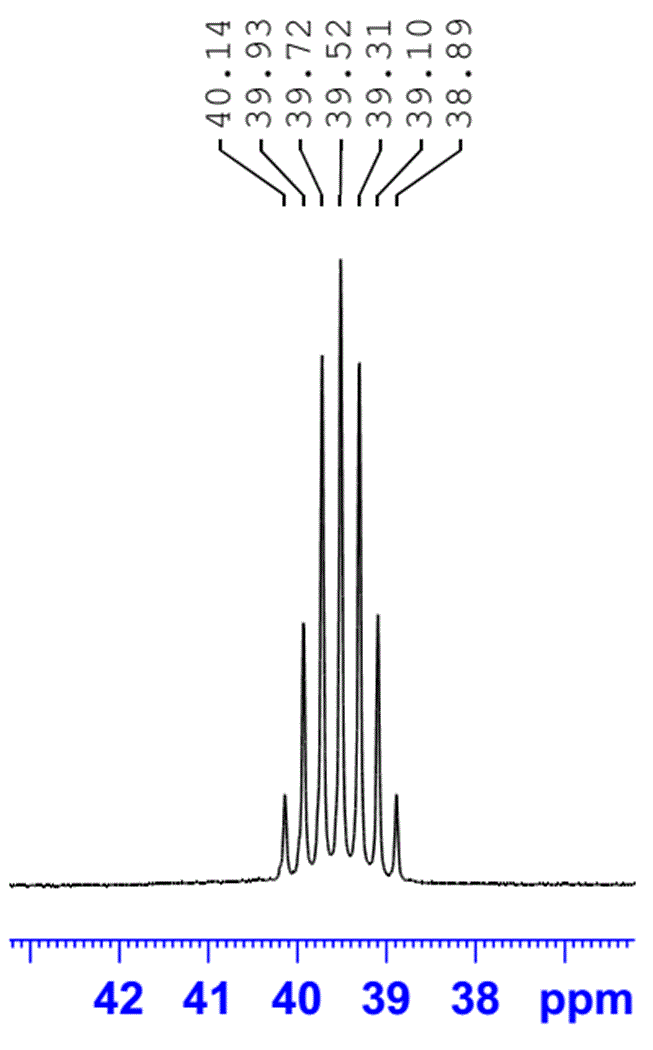
^{13}C NMR Spectrum of DMSO-d_{6}

DMSO is a good solvent for many organic compounds. Because deuterated DMSO does not contain any ^{1</1}H atoms, it produces no peaks in ^{1}H-NMR and as a result is commonly used as a solvent for NMR experiments. Commercially available deuteriated DMSO is not isotopically pure. The residual DMSO-d_{5} produces a ^{1}H-NMR signal observed at 2.50 ppm, which appears as a quintet (J_{HD}=1.9Hz). In ^{13}C-NMR, the chemical shift of DMSO-d_{6} is 39.52 ppm, and appears as a septet.

== Trideuteromethyl donor ==
Deuterated DMSO is used as a reagent for the introduction of a trideuteromethyl group (CD_{3}) onto organic structures.
