= Deuterated dichloromethane =

Stereo, skeletal formula of deuterated dichloromethane
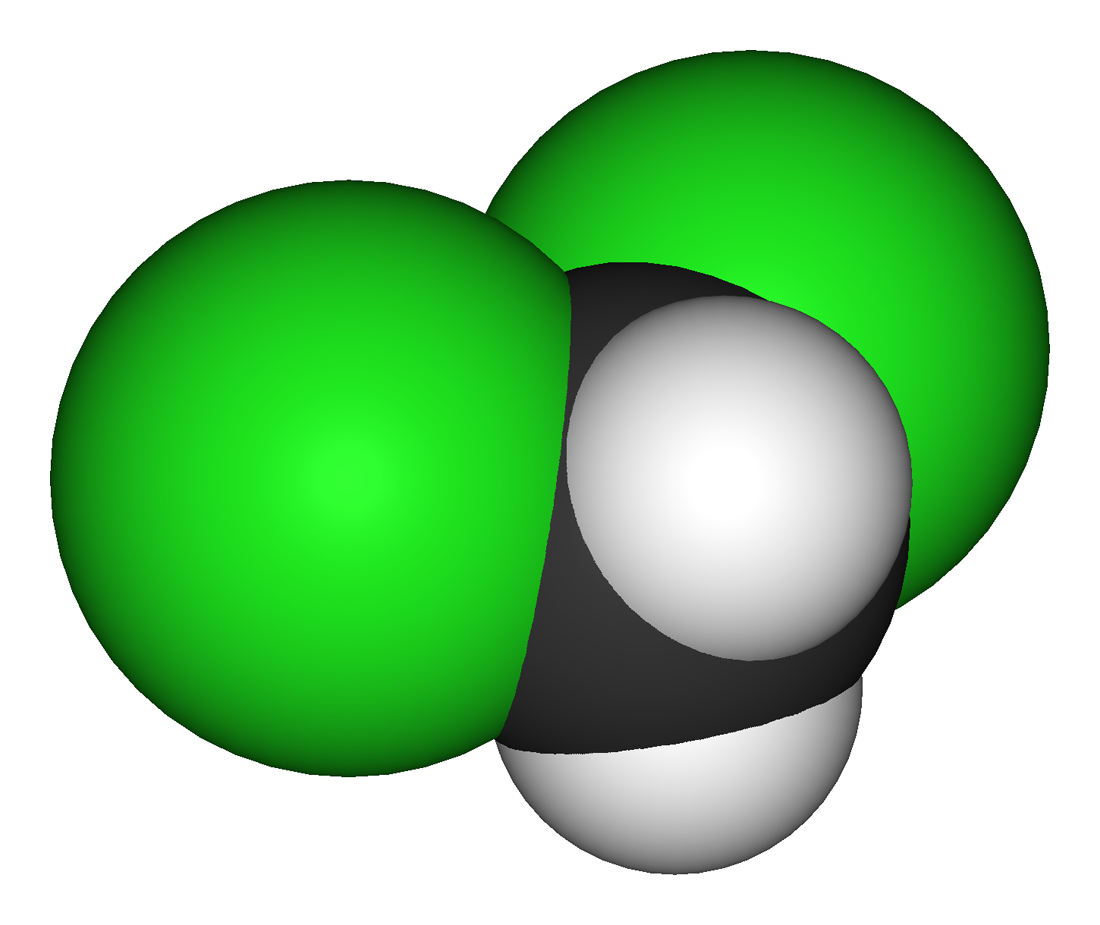
Spacefill model of deuterated dichloromethane

Names
- Preferred IUPAC name Dichloro(^{2}H_{2})methane

Identifiers
CAS Number	1665-00-5
3D model (JSmol)	Interactive image
Beilstein Reference	1733318
ChemSpider	141111
ECHA InfoCard	100.015.252
EC Number	216-776-0
PubChem CID	160586
UN number	1593
CompTox Dashboard (EPA)	DTXSID80937204
- InChI: InChI=1S/CH2Cl2/c2-1-3/h1H2/i1D2 Key: YMWUJEATGCHHMB-DICFDUPASA-N
- SMILES: [2H]C([2H])(Cl)Cl

Properties
Chemical formula	C^{2}H_{2}Cl_{2} or CD_{2}Cl_{2}
Molar mass	86.945 g·mol^{−1}
Density	1.362 g cm^{−3}
Boiling point	40 °C (104 °F; 313 K)
Vapor pressure	52.6 kPa (at 20 °C)

Hazards
- GHS labelling
Pictograms	(GHS07: Exclamation mark) (GHS08: Health hazard)
Signal word	Warning
Hazard statements	H315, H319, H335, H351, H373
Precautionary statements	P201, P202, P260, P264, P271, P280, P281, P302+P352, P304+P340, P305+P351+P338, P308+P313, P312, P314, P321, P332+P313, P337+P313, P362, P403+P233, P405, P501
NFPA 704 (fire diamond)	2 1 0

Related compounds
Related compounds	Deuterated chloroform Dichloromethane
- Except where otherwise noted, data are given for materials in their standard state (at 25 °C [77 °F], 100 kPa). Infobox references

Deuterated dichloromethane (CD_{2}Cl_{2} or C^{2}H_{2}Cl_{2}) (Note: IUPAC recommends that the symbol for deuterium should be ^{2}H, rather than D. It follows that the latter formula, C^{2}H_{2}Cl_{2}, is more correct.) is a form (isotopologue) of dichloromethane (DCM, CH_{2}Cl_{2}) in which the hydrogen atoms (H) are deuterium (heavy hydrogen) (^{2}H or D). Deuterated DCM is not a common solvent used in NMR spectroscopy as it is expensive compared to deuterated chloroform.
