= Dichloromethane =

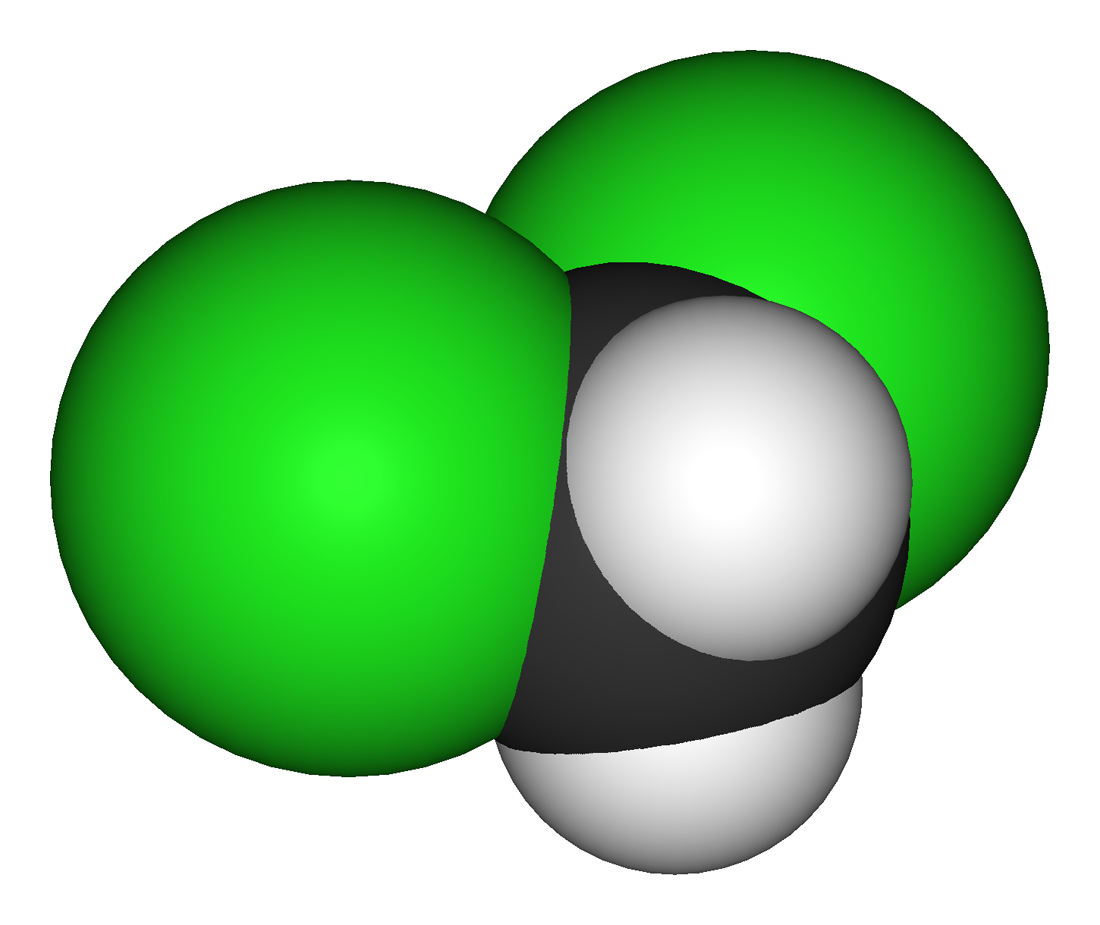

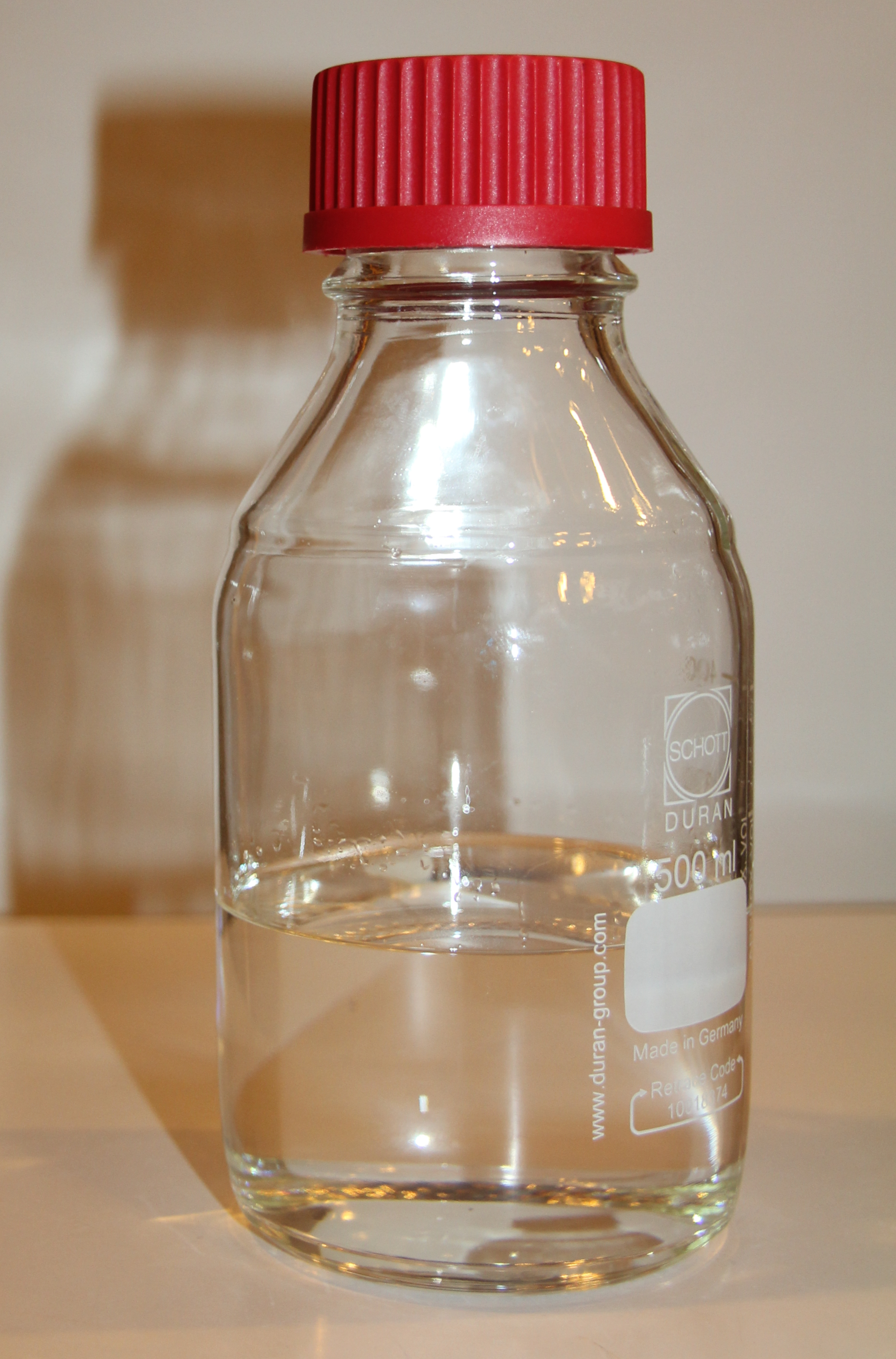

Names
- Preferred IUPAC name Dichloromethane
- Other names Methylene bichloride; Methylene chloride gas; Methylene dichloride; Solmethine; Narkotil; Solaesthin; Di-clo; Refrigerant-30; Freon-30; R-30; DCM; MDC

Identifiers
CAS Number	75-09-2
3D model (JSmol)	Interactive image
ChEBI	CHEBI:15767
ChEMBL	ChEMBL45967
ChemSpider	6104
ECHA InfoCard	100.000.763
EC Number	200-838-9
KEGG	D02330
PubChem CID	6344
RTECS number	PA8050000
UNII	588X2YUY0A
UN number	1593
CompTox Dashboard (EPA)	DTXSID0020868
- InChI: InChI=1S/CH2Cl2/c2-1-3/h1H2 Key: YMWUJEATGCHHMB-UHFFFAOYSA-N; InChI=1/CH2Cl2/c2-1-3/h1H2 Key: YMWUJEATGCHHMB-UHFFFAOYAG
- SMILES: ClCCl

Properties
Chemical formula	CH_{2}Cl_{2}
Molar mass	84.93 g·mol^{−1}
Appearance	Colorless liquid
Odor	Faint, minty, chloroform-like
Density	1.3266 g/cm^{3} (20 °C)
Melting point	−96.7 °C (−142.1 °F; 176.5 K)
Boiling point	39.6 °C (103.3 °F; 312.8 K) decomposes at 720 °C; 39.75 °C (103.55 °F; 312.90 K) at 760 mmHg
Solubility in water	25.6 g/L (15 °C); 17.5 g/L (25 °C); 15.8 g/L (30 °C); 5.2 g/L (60 °C)
Solubility	Miscible in ethyl acetate, alcohol, hexanes, benzene, CCl_{4}, diethyl ether, CHCl_{3}
log P	1.19
Vapor pressure	0.13 kPa (−70.5 °C); 2 kPa (−40 °C); 19.3 kPa (0 °C); 57.3 kPa (25 °C); 79.99 kPa (35 °C)
Henry's law constant (k_{H})	3.25 L·atm/mol
Magnetic susceptibility (χ)	−46.6·10^{−6} cm^{3}/mol
Refractive index (n_{D})	1.4244 (20 °C)
Viscosity	0.43 cP (20 °C); 0.413 cP (25 °C)

Structure
Dipole moment	1.6 D

Thermochemistry
Heat capacity (C)	102.3 J/(mol·K)
Std molar entropy (S^{⦵}_{298})	174.5 J/(mol·K)
Std enthalpy of formation (Δ_{f}H^{⦵}_{298})	−124.3 kJ/mol
Std enthalpy of combustion (Δ_{c}H^{⦵}_{298})	−454.0 kJ/mol (from standard enthalpies of formation)

Pharmacology
- Pharmacokinetics
Biological half-life	<30 min (75% after 30 minutes, rats)
Excretion	Breath (90% unmetabolized, 3% CO_{2}, 2% CO, rats), urine

Hazards
- Occupational safety and health (OHS/OSH)
Eye hazards	Irritant
- GHS labelling
Pictograms	(GHS07: Exclamation mark) (GHS08: Health hazard)
Signal word	Warning
Hazard statements	H315, H319, H336, H351, H420
Precautionary statements	P261, P280, P302+P352, P305+P351+P338, P308+P313
NFPA 704 (fire diamond)	2 1 0
Flash point	None, but can form flammable vapor-air mixtures above ≈100 °C
Autoignition temperature	556 °C (1,033 °F; 829 K)
Explosive limits	13%-23%
- Lethal dose or concentration (LD, LC)
LD_{50} (median dose)	1.25 g/kg (rats, oral); 2 g/kg (rabbits, oral)
LC_{50} (median concentration)	24,929 ppm (rat, 30 min); 14,400 ppm (mouse, 7 h)
LC_{Lo} (lowest published)	5000 ppm (guinea pig, 2 h); 10,000 ppm (rabbit, 7 h); 12,295 ppm (cat, 4.5 h); 14,108 ppm (dog, 7 h)
- NIOSH (US health exposure limits)
PEL (Permissible)	25 ppm over 8 hours (time-weighted average), 125 ppm over 15 minutes (STEL)
REL (Recommended)	Ca
IDLH (Immediate danger)	Ca [2300 ppm]
Legal status	BR: Class B1 (Psychoactive drugs)

Supplementary data page
- Dichloromethane (data page)
- Except where otherwise noted, data are given for materials in their standard state (at 25 °C [77 °F], 100 kPa). verify (what is ?) Infobox references

Dichloromethane (DCM, methylene chloride, or methylene bichloride) is an organochlorine compound and a dihalomethane with the formula CH_{2}Cl_{2}. This colorless, volatile liquid with a chloroform-like, sweet odor is widely used as a solvent. Although it is not miscible with water, it is slightly polar and miscible with many organic solvents.

== Occurrence ==
Natural sources of dichloromethane include oceanic sources, macroalgae, wetlands, and volcanoes. However, the majority of dichloromethane in the environment is the result of industrial emissions.

== Production ==
DCM is produced by treating either chloromethane or methane with chlorine gas at 400–500 °C. At these temperatures, both methane and chloromethane undergo a series of reactions producing progressively more chlorinated products. In this way, an estimated 400,000 tons were produced in the US, Europe, and Japan in 1993.

CH_{4} + Cl_{2} → CH_{3}Cl + HCl
CH_{3}Cl + Cl_{2} → CH_{2}Cl_{2} + HCl
CH_{2}Cl_{2} + Cl_{2} → CHCl_{3} + HCl
CHCl_{3} + Cl_{2} → CCl_{4} + HCl

The output of these processes is a mixture of chloromethane, dichloromethane, chloroform, and carbon tetrachloride as well as hydrogen chloride as a byproduct. These compounds are separated by distillation.

DCM was first prepared in 1839 by the French chemist Henri Victor Regnault (1810–1878), who isolated it from a mixture of chloromethane and chlorine that had been exposed to sunlight.

== Uses ==
DCM's volatility and ability to dissolve a wide range of organic compounds makes it a useful solvent for many chemical processes. In the past it was used to decaffeinate coffee and tea, though it has mostly been replaced by extraction using supercritical CO_{2}, as well as to prepare extracts of hops and other flavourings. Its volatility has led to its use as an aerosol spray propellant and as a blowing agent for polyurethane foams.

=== Specialized uses ===
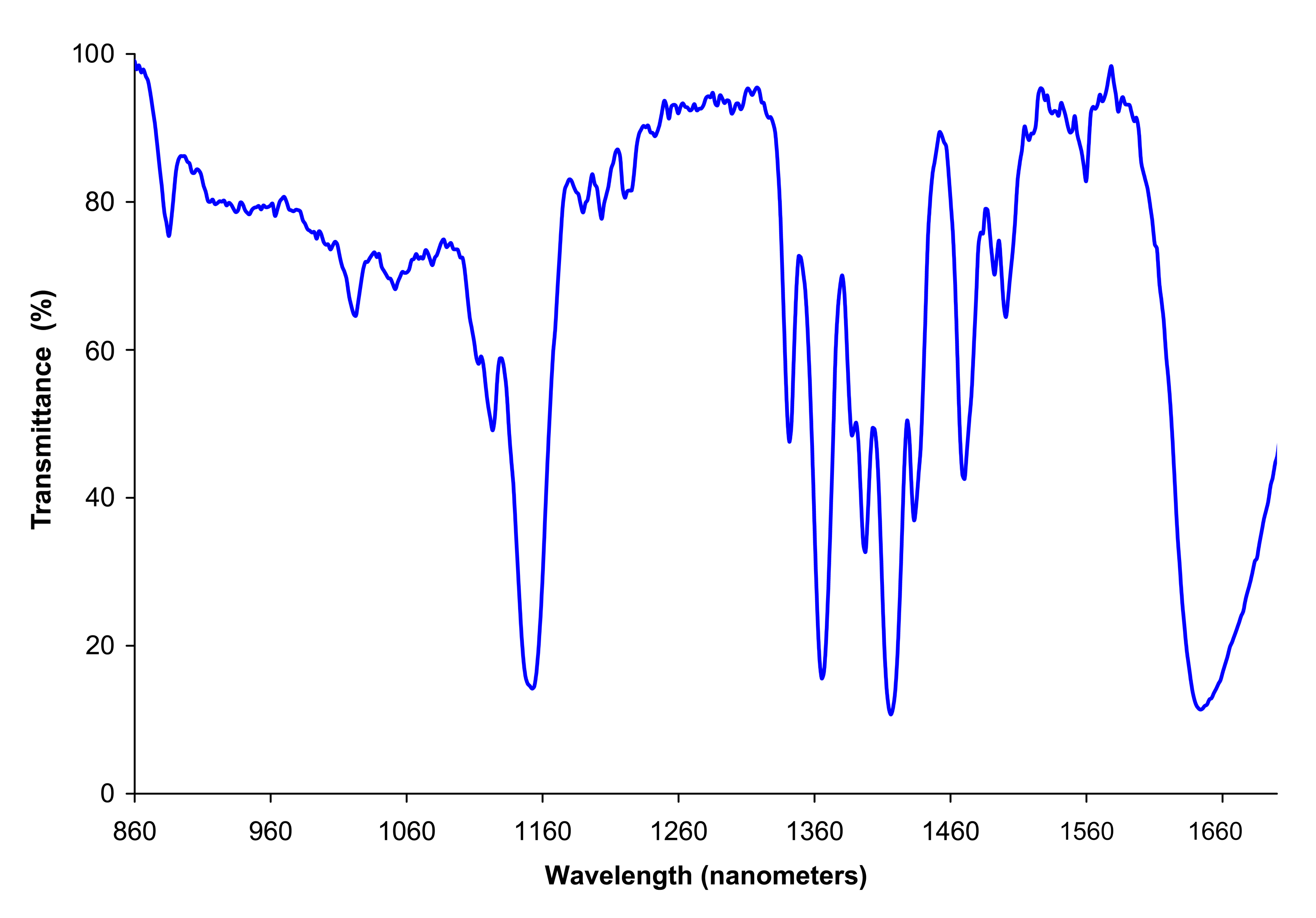
Near IR absorption spectrum of dichloromethane showing complicated overlapping overtones of mid IR absorption features

The chemical compound's low boiling point allows the chemical to function in a heat engine that can extract mechanical energy from small temperature differences. An example of a DCM heat engine is the drinking bird. The toy works at room temperature. It is also used as the fluid in jukebox displays and holiday bubble lights that have a colored bubbling tube above a lamp as a source of heat and a small amount of rock salt to provide thermal mass and a nucleation site for the phase changing solvent.

DCM (as R-30) was historically utilized as a low flammability, and non-ozone depleting refrigerant in low-pressure centrifugal chillers. It began gaining prominence as a refrigerant after Willis Carrier began experimenting with compact radial turbo compressors around 1919.

DCM chemically welds certain plastics. For example, it is used to seal the casing of electric meters. Often sold as a main component of plastic welding adhesives, it is also used extensively by model building hobbyists for joining plastic components together. It is commonly referred to as "Di-clo".

It is used in the garment printing industry for removal of heat-sealed garment transfers.

DCM is used in the material testing field of civil engineering; specifically it is used during the testing of bituminous materials as a solvent to separate the binder from the aggregate of an asphalt or macadam to allow the testing of the materials.

It has been used as the principal component of various paint and lacquer strippers, although its use is now restricted in the EU and many such products now use benzyl alcohol as a safer alternative.

== Chemical reactions ==
Dichloromethane is widely used as a solvent in part because it is relatively inert. It does participate in reactions with certain strong nucleophiles however. tert-Butyllithium deprotonates DCM:

H_{2}CCl_{2} + RLi → HCCl_{2}Li + RH

Methyllithium reacts with dichloromethane to give chlorocarbene:

CH_{2}Cl_{2} + CH_{3}Li → CHCl + CH_{4} + LiCl

Although DCM is a common solvent in organic chemistry laboratories and is commonly assumed to be inert, it does react with some amines and triazoles. Tertiary amines can react with DCM to form quaternary chloromethyl chloride salts via the Menshutkin reaction. Secondary amines can react with DCM to yield an equilibrium of iminium chlorides and chloromethyl chlorides, which can react with a second equivalent of the secondary amine to form aminals. At increased temperatures, pyridines including DMAP, react with DCM to form methylene bispyridinium dichlorides. Hydroxybenzotriazole and related reagents used in peptide coupling react with DCM in the presence of triethylamine, forming acetals.

== Toxicity ==
Serious health risks are associated with DCM, even though it is one of the least toxic simple chlorohydrocarbons. Its high volatility makes it an inhalation hazard. It can also be absorbed through the skin. Symptoms of acute overexposure to dichloromethane via inhalation include difficulty concentrating, dizziness, fatigue, nausea, headaches, numbness, weakness, and irritation of the upper respiratory tract and eyes. More severe consequences can include suffocation, loss of consciousness, coma, and death.

Although the vast majority of DCM is exhaled in its unchanged form, a small percentage of DCM is metabolized to carbon monoxide, potentially leading to carbon monoxide poisoning. Acute exposure by inhalation has resulted in optic neuropathy and hepatitis. Prolonged skin contact can result in DCM dissolving some of the fatty tissues in skin, resulting in skin irritation or chemical burns.

It may be carcinogenic, as it has been linked to cancer of the lungs, liver, and pancreas in laboratory animals. Other animal studies showed breast cancer and salivary gland cancer. Research is not yet clear as to what levels may be carcinogenic to humans. DCM crosses the placenta but fetal toxicity in women who are exposed to it during pregnancy has not been proven. In animal experiments, it was fetotoxic at doses that were maternally toxic but no teratogenic effects were seen. Carcinogenic effects may be observed in those exposed to DCM due to its ability to be metabolized in the liver into carbon monoxide and formaldehyde, a known carcinogen.

In people with pre-existing heart problems, exposure to DCM can cause abnormal heart rhythms and/or heart attacks, sometimes without any other symptoms of overexposure. People with existing liver, nervous system, or skin problems may worsen after exposure to dichloromethane.

=== Regulation ===
In many countries, products containing DCM must carry labels warning of its health risks. Concerns about its health effects have led to a search for alternatives in many of its applications.

In the European Union, the Scientific Committee on Occupational Exposure Limit Values (SCOEL) recommends an occupational exposure limit for DCM of 100 ppm (8-hour time-weighted average) and a short-term exposure limit of 200 ppm for a 15-minute period. The European Parliament voted in 2009 to ban the use of DCM in paint-strippers for consumers and many professionals, with the ban taking effect in December 2010.

In February 2013, the US Occupational Safety and Health Administration (OSHA) and the National Institute for Occupational Safety and Health warned that at least 14 bathtub refinishers have died since 2000 from DCM exposure. These workers had been working alone, in poorly ventilated bathrooms, with inadequate or no respiratory protection, and no training about the hazards of DCM. OSHA has since then issued a DCM standard.

On March 15, 2019, the US Environmental Protection Agency (EPA) issued a final rule to prohibit the manufacture (including importing and exporting), processing, and distribution of DCM in all paint removers for consumer use, effective in 180 days. However, it does not affect other products containing DCM, including many consumer products not intended for paint removal. On April 20, 2023, the EPA proposed a widespread ban on the production of DCM with some exceptions for military and industrial uses. On April 30, 2024, the EPA finalized a ban on most commercial uses of DCM, which mainly banned its application for stripping paint and degreasing surfaces but allowed for some remaining commercial applications, such as chemical production.

The EPA (Environmental Protection Agency) finalized a ban on most uses of dichloromethane in April 2024. This ban, which took effect on July 8, 2024, prohibits most industrial and commercial uses of the chemical, including its use in paint removers for consumer use.

New U.S. Environmental Protection Agency (EPA) regulations under the Toxic Substances Control Act (TSCA) have significantly lowered permissible exposure limits for dichloromethane to 2 ppm TWA and 16 ppm STEL, far below OSHA's existing standard (29 CFR 1910.1052). For remaining permitted uses, this necessitates a Workplace Chemical Protection Program (WCPP) requiring initial and periodic exposure monitoring at these much stricter levels to protect worker health. This EPA Final Rule (89 FR 39806) drives the new compliance requirements for monitoring.

== Environmental effects ==
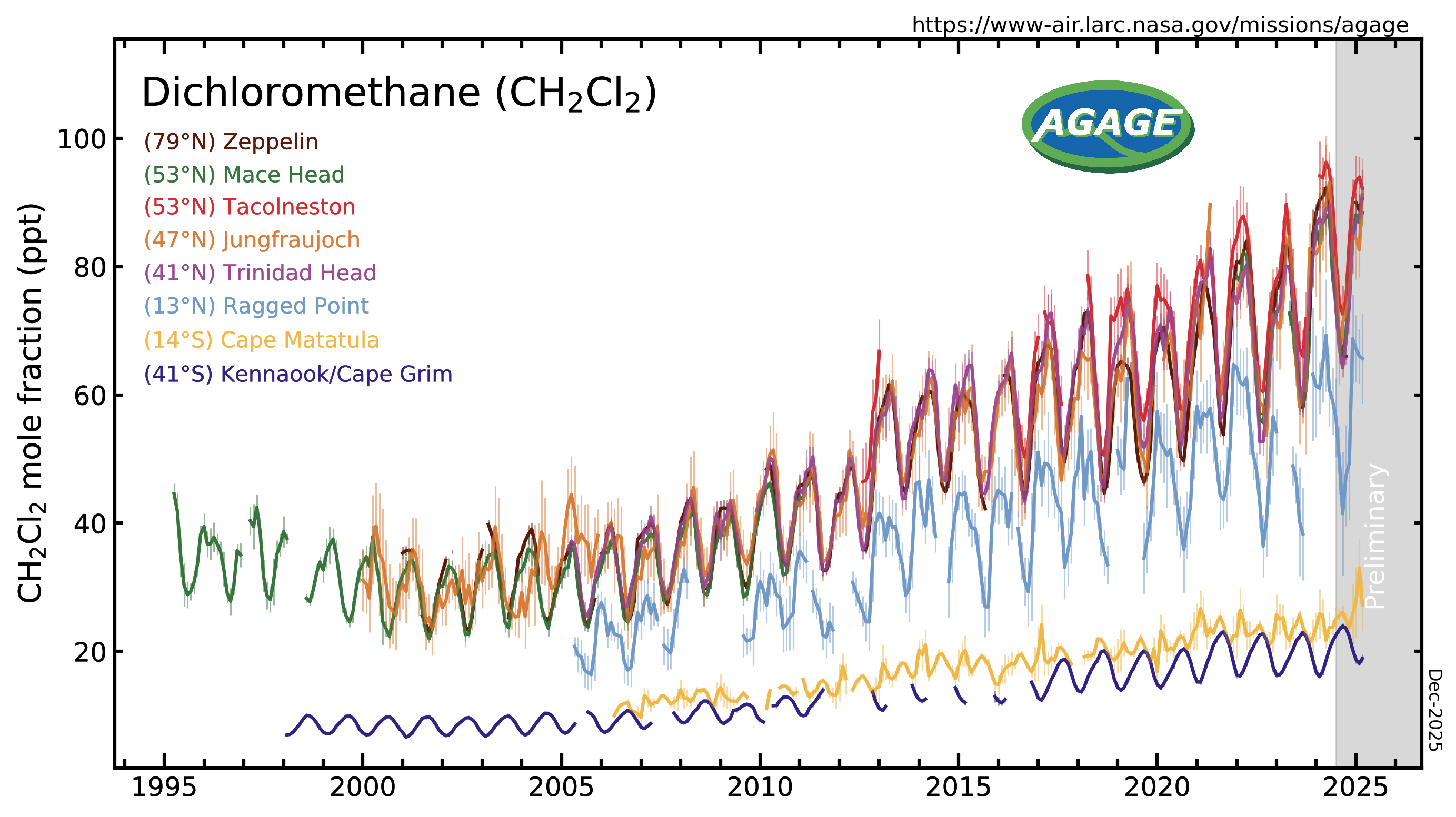
CH_{2}Cl_{2} measured by the Advanced Global Atmospheric Gases Experiment (AGAGE) in the lower atmosphere (troposphere) at stations around the world. Abundances are given as pollution free monthly mean mole fractions in parts-per-trillion.

Dichloromethane is not classified as an ozone-depleting substance by the Montreal Protocol. The US Clean Air Act does not regulate dichloromethane as an ozone depleter. Dichloromethane has been classified as a very short-lived substance (VSLS). Despite their short atmospheric lifetimes of less than 0.5 year, VSLSs can contribute to stratospheric ozone depletion, particularly if emitted in regions where rapid transport to the stratosphere occurs. Atmospheric abundances of dichloromethane have been increasing in recent years.

== See also ==
- Deuterated dichloromethane
- Chloromethane
- Trichloromethane
- Tetrachloromethane
- List of organic compounds
- Carbon monoxide-releasing molecules
