= Deuterated ethanol =

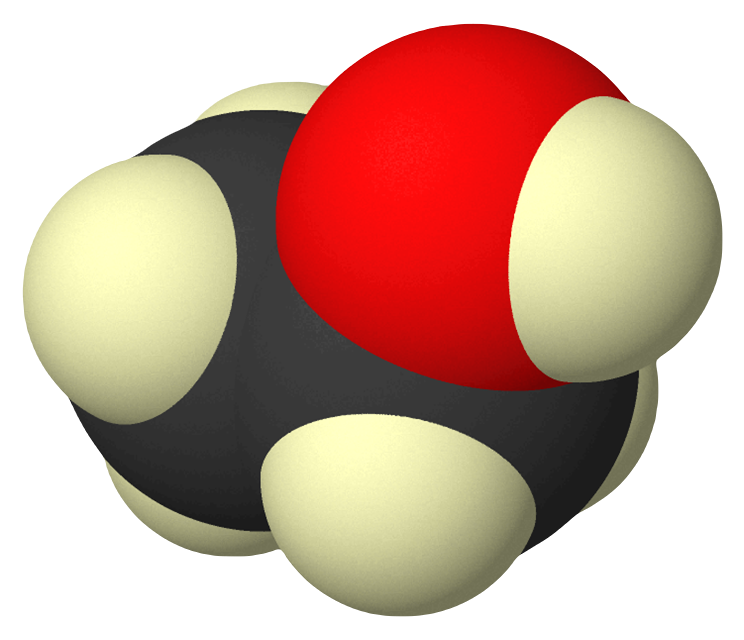

Names
- Preferred IUPAC name (^{2}H_{5})Ethan(^{2}H)ol
- Other names: Ethanol-d6; Ethyl alcohol-d6; Ethyl-d5 alcohol-d; Hexadeuteroethanol

Identifiers
CAS Number	1516-08-1
3D model (JSmol)	Interactive image
ChemSpider	92272
ECHA InfoCard	100.014.693
PubChem CID	102138
CompTox Dashboard (EPA)	DTXSID80934298
- InChI: Key: LFQSCWFLJHTTHZ-LIDOUZCJSA-N; InChI=1S/C2H6O/c1-2-3/h3H,2H2,1H3/i1D3,2D2,3D
- SMILES: [2H]C([2H])([2H])C([2H])([2H])O[2H]

Properties
Chemical formula	C_{2}D_{6}O
Molar mass	52.10 g·mol^{-1}
Density	0.892 g/mL
Boiling point	78 °C (172 °F; 351 K)
- Except where otherwise noted, data are given for materials in their standard state (at 25 °C [77 °F], 100 kPa). Infobox references

Deuterated ethanol (C_{2}D_{5}OD or CD_{3}CD_{2}OD) is a form (called an isotopologue) of ethanol (C_{2}H_{5}OH) in which the hydrogen atom ("H") is replaced with deuterium (heavy hydrogen) isotope ("D"). Deuterated ethanol is an uncommon solvent used in NMR spectroscopy.
