= Deuterated THF =

Chemical compound

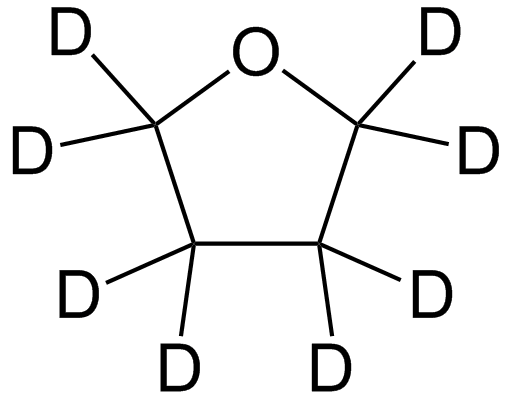
Skeletal formula of deuterated THF
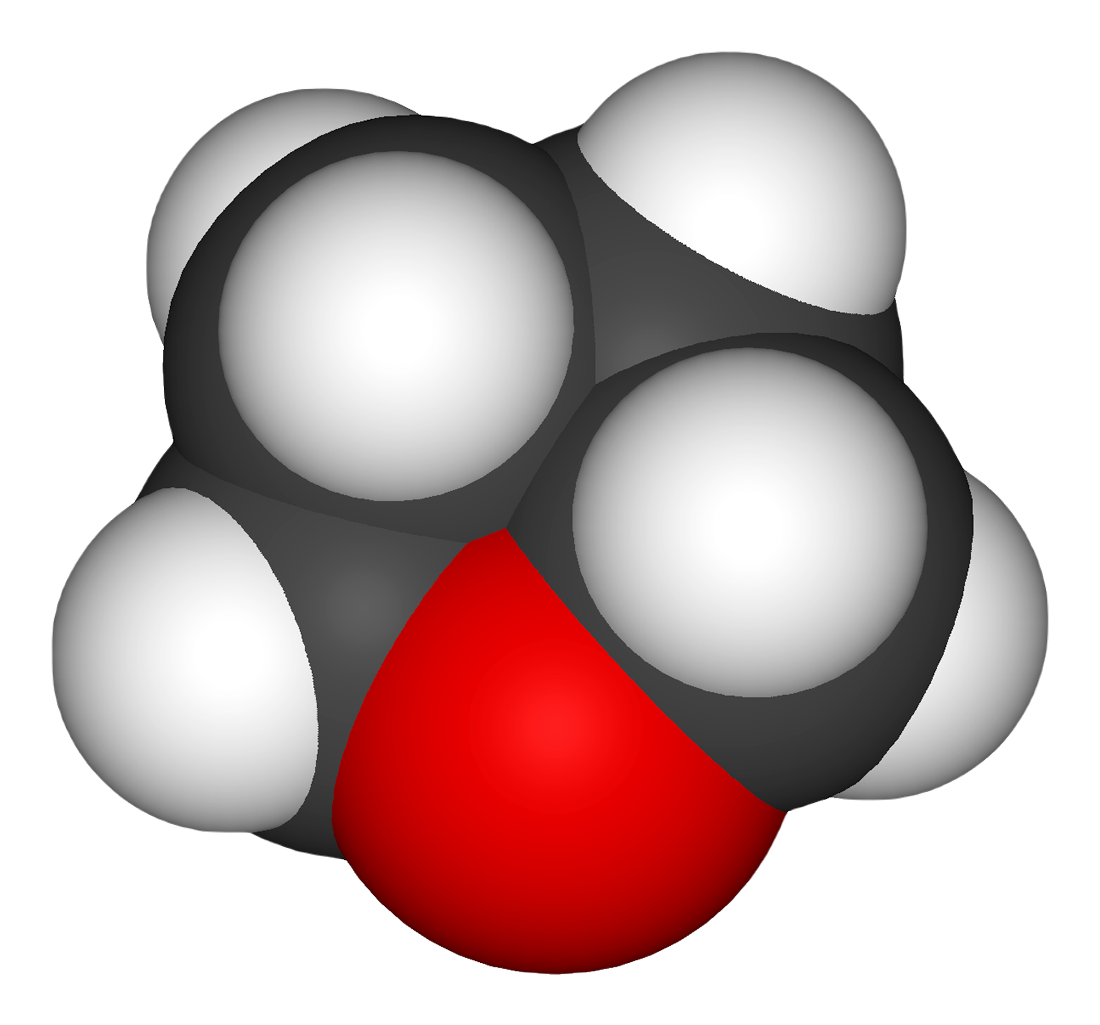
Spacefill model of deuterated THF
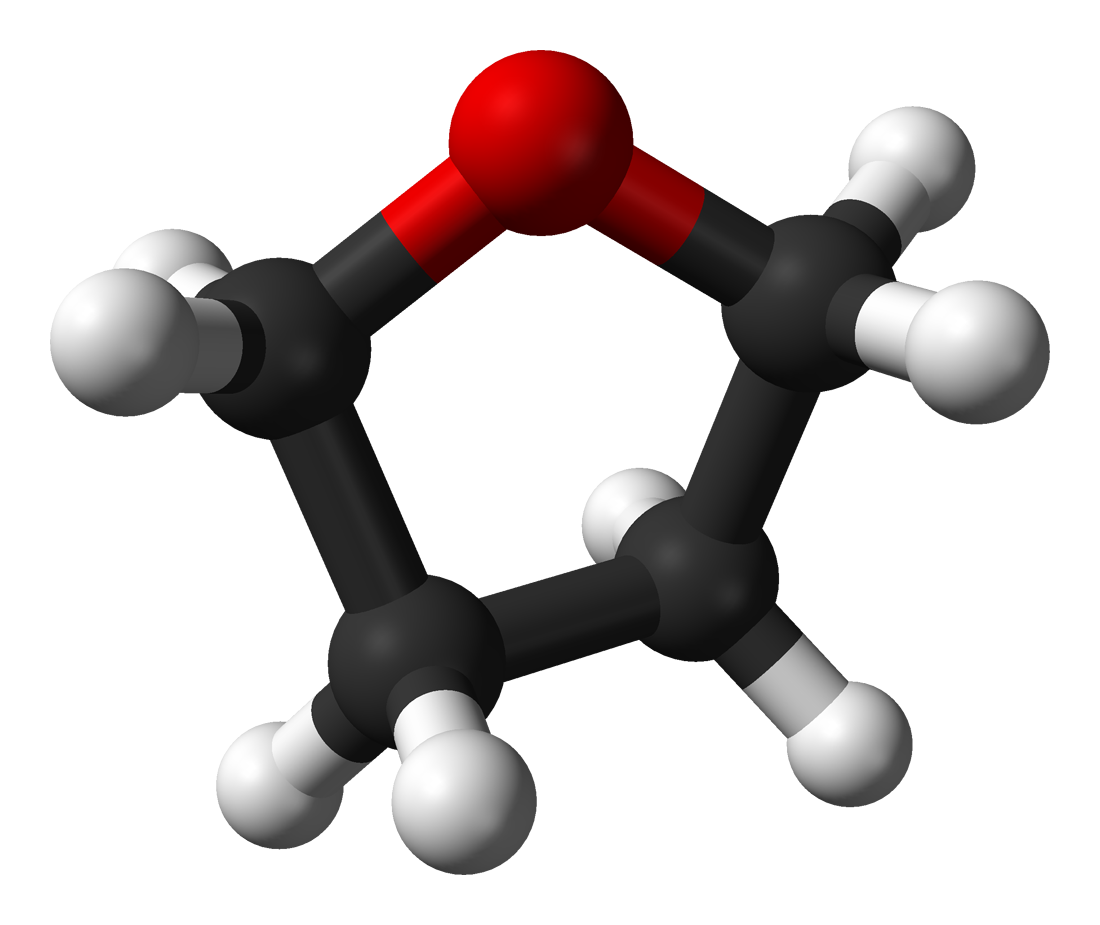
- Ball and stick model of deuterated THF

Identifiers
CAS Number	1693-74-9
3D model (JSmol)	Interactive image
Beilstein Reference	111854
ChemSpider	72531
ECHA InfoCard	100.015.363
EC Number	216-898-4
PubChem CID	80290
UN number	2056
CompTox Dashboard (EPA)	DTXSID00937620
- InChI: InChI=1S/C4H8O/c1-2-4-5-3-1/h1-4H2/i1D2,2D2,3D2,4D2 Key: WYURNTSHIVDZCO-SVYQBANQSA-N
- SMILES: [2H]C1([2H])OC([2H])([2H])C([2H])([2H])C1([2H])[2H]

Properties
Chemical formula	C_{4}D_{8}O
Molar mass	80.1550 g mol^{−1}
Appearance	Colourless liquid
Density	985 mg cm^{−3}
Melting point	−106 °C (−159 °F; 167 K)
Boiling point	65 to 66 °C (149 to 151 °F; 338 to 339 K)

Hazards
- GHS labelling
Pictograms	(GHS02: Flammable) (GHS07: Exclamation mark)
Signal word	Danger
Hazard statements	H225, H319, H335
Precautionary statements	P210, P261, P305+P351+P338
NFPA 704 (fire diamond)	2 3 0
Flash point	−17 °C (1 °F; 256 K)
- Except where otherwise noted, data are given for materials in their standard state (at 25 °C [77 °F], 100 kPa). verify (what is ?) Infobox references

Deuterated tetrahydrofuran (d_{8}-THF) is a colourless, organic liquid at standard temperature and pressure. This heterocyclic compound has the chemical formula C_{4}D_{8}O, and is an isotopologue of tetrahydrofuran. Deuterated THF is used as a solvent in NMR spectroscopy, though its expense can often be prohibitive.
