= Deuterated chloroform =

Chemical compound

Stereo, skeletal formula of deuterated chloroform
Spacefill model of deuterated chloroform

Names
- IUPAC name trichloro(deuterio)methane
- Preferred IUPAC name trichloro(²H)methane
- Other names Chloroform-d; Deuterochloroform

Identifiers
CAS Number	865-49-6
3D model (JSmol)	Interactive image
Beilstein Reference	1697633
ChEBI	CHEBI:85365
ChemSpider	64654
ECHA InfoCard	100.011.585
EC Number	212-742-4
PubChem CID	71583
UNII	P1NW4885VT
UN number	1888
CompTox Dashboard (EPA)	DTXSID50904766
- InChI: InChI=1S/CHCl3/c2-1(3)4/h1H/i1D Key: HEDRZPFGACZZDS-MICDWDOJSA-N; InChI=1/CHCl3/c2-1(3)4/h1H/i1D Key: HEDRZPFGACZZDS-MICDWDOJEH
- SMILES: [2H]C(Cl)(Cl)Cl

Properties
Chemical formula	CDCl_{3}
Molar mass	120.384 g·mol^{-1}
Appearance	Colorless liquid
Odor	chloroform-like
Density	1.500 g/cm^{3}
Melting point	−64 °C (−83 °F; 209 K)
Boiling point	61 °C (142 °F; 334 K)

Hazards
- GHS labelling
Pictograms	(GHS06: Toxic) (GHS07: Exclamation mark) (GHS08: Health hazard)
Signal word	Danger
Hazard statements	H302, H315, H319, H331, H336, H351, H361, H372, H373
Precautionary statements	P201, P202, P260, P264, P270, P271, P280, P281, P301+P312, P302+P352, P304+P340, P305+P351+P338, P308+P313, P311, P312, P314, P321, P330, P332+P313, P337+P313, P362, P403+P233, P405, P501
NFPA 704 (fire diamond)	2 0 0

Related compounds
Related compounds	Chloroform Deuterated dichloromethane
- Except where otherwise noted, data are given for materials in their standard state (at 25 °C [77 °F], 100 kPa). verify (what is ?) Infobox references

Deuterated chloroform, also known as chloroform-d and deuterochloroform, is the organic compound with the formula CDCl_{3}. Deuterated chloroform is a common solvent used in NMR spectroscopy. The properties of CDCl_{3} and ordinary CHCl_{3} (chloroform) are virtually identical.

Deuterochloroform was first made in 1935 during the years of research on deuterium.

== Preparation ==
Deuterated chloroform is commercially available. It is more easily produced and less expensive than deuterated dichloromethane. Deuterochloroform is produced by the reaction of hexachloroacetone with deuterium oxide, using pyridine as a catalyst. The large difference in boiling points between the starting material and product facilitate purification by distillation.

O=C(CCl_{3})_{2} + D_{2}O → 2 CDCl_{3} + CO_{2}

Treating chloral with sodium deuteroxide (NaOD) gives deuterated chloroform.

== NMR solvent ==
In proton NMR spectroscopy, deuterated solvent (enriched to >99% deuterium) is typically used to avoid recording a large interfering signal or signals from the proton(s) (i.e., hydrogen-1) present in the solvent itself. If nondeuterated chloroform (containing a full equivalent of protium) were used as solvent, the solvent signal would almost certainly overwhelm and obscure any nearby analyte signals. In addition, modern instruments usually require the presence of deuterated solvent, as the field frequency is locked using the deuterium signal of the solvent to prevent frequency drift. Commercial chloroform-d does, however, still contain a small amount (0.2% or less) of non-deuterated chloroform; this results in a small singlet at 7.26 ppm, known as the residual solvent peak, which is frequently used as an internal chemical shift reference.

In carbon-13 NMR spectroscopy, the sole carbon in deuterated chloroform shows a triplet at a chemical shift of 77.16 ppm with the three peaks being about equal size, resulting from splitting by spin coupling to the attached spin-1 deuterium atom (CHCl_{3} has a chemical shift of 77.36 ppm).

Deuterated chloroform is a general purpose NMR solvent, as it is not very chemically reactive and unlikely to exchange its deuterium with its solute, and its low boiling point allows for easy sample recovery. It, however, it is incompatible with strongly basic, nucleophilic, or reducing analytes, including many organometallic compounds.

== Hazards ==
Chloroform reacts photochemically with oxygen to form chlorine, phosgene and hydrogen chloride. To slow this process and reduce the acidity of the solvent, chloroform-d is stored in brown-tinted bottles, often over copper chips or silver foil as stabilizer. Instead of metals, a small amount of a neutralizing base like potassium carbonate may be added. It is less toxic to the liver and kidneys than CHCl_{3} due to the stronger C−D bond as compared to the C−H bond, making it somewhat less prone to form the destructive trichloromethyl radical (•CCl_{3}).
