= Phosphorus-31 nuclear magnetic resonance =

Spectroscopy technique for molecules containing phosphorus

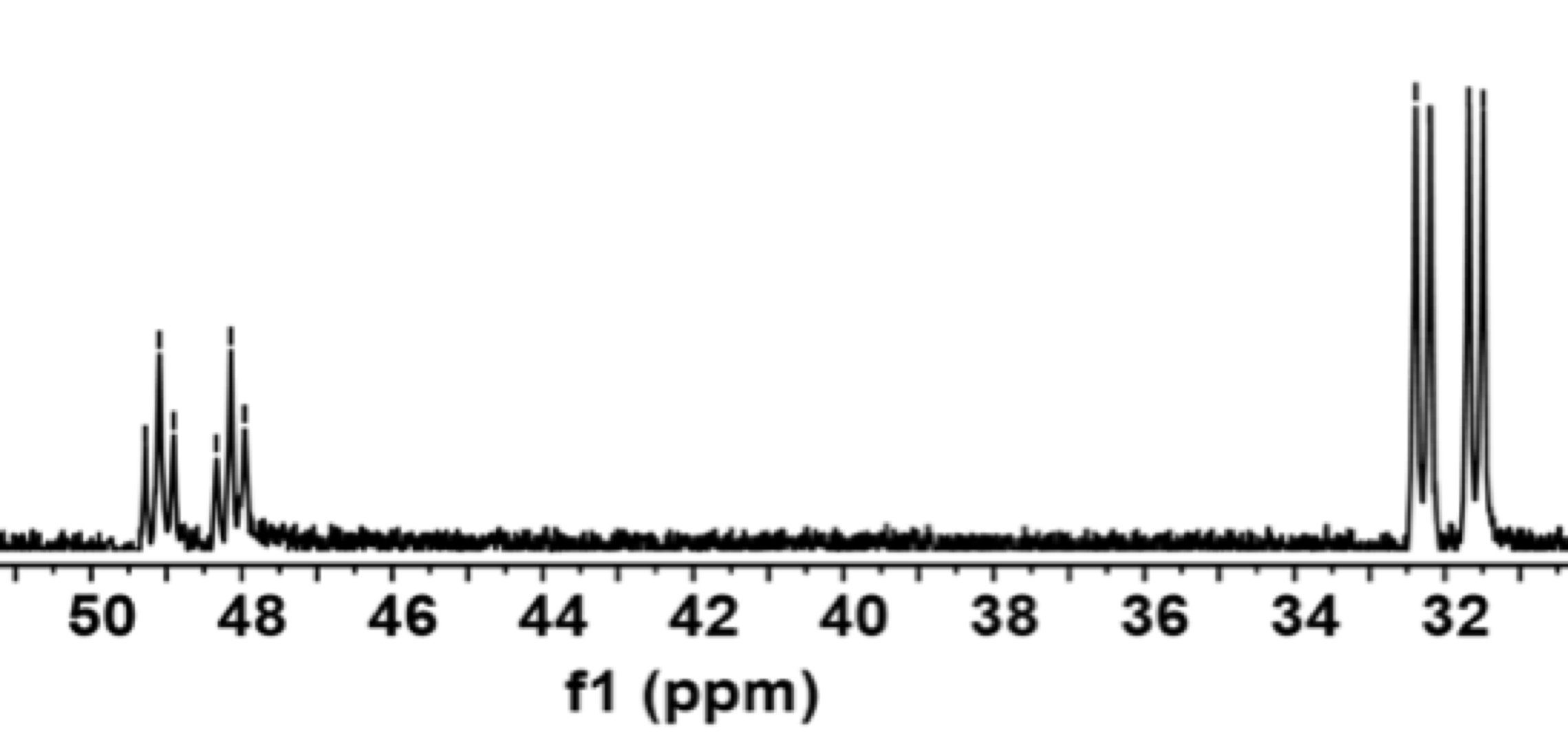
^{31}P-NMR spectrum of Wilkinson's catalyst (RhCl(PPh_{3})_{3}) in toluene solution. In addition to ^{31}P–^{31}P coupling between the two types of phosphine centers, ^{103}Rh–^{31}P coupling is also evident. The chemical shifts are referenced to external 85% H_{3}PO_{4}.

Phosphorus-31 NMR spectroscopy is an analytical chemistry technique that uses nuclear magnetic resonance (NMR) to study chemical compounds that contain phosphorus. Phosphorus is commonly found in organic compounds and coordination complexes (as phosphines), making it useful to measure ^{31}- NMR spectra routinely. Solution ^{31}P-NMR is one of the more routine NMR techniques because ^{31}P has an isotopic abundance of 100% and a relatively high gyromagnetic ratio. The ^{31}P nucleus also has a spin of 1/2, making spectra relatively easy to interpret. The only other highly sensitive NMR-active nuclei spin 1/2 that are monoisotopic (or nearly so) are ^{1}H and ^{19}F. (Note: The nuclei ^{89}Y, ^{103}Rh and ^{169}Tm are also monoisotopic and spin 1/2, but have very low magnetogyric ratios.)

== Operational aspects ==
With a gyromagnetic ratio 40.5% of that for ^{1}H, ^{31}P-NMR signals are observed near 202 MHz on an 11.7-tesla magnet (used for 500 MHz ^{1}H-NMR measurements). Chemical shifts are typically referenced to 85% phosphoric acid, which is assigned the chemical shift of 0, and appear at positive values (downfield of the standard). Due to the inconsistent nuclear Overhauser effect, integrations are not useful. Most often, spectra are recorded with protons decoupled.

== Applications in chemistry ==
^{31}P-NMR spectroscopy is useful to assay purity and to assign structures of phosphorus-containing compounds because these signals are well resolved and often occur at characteristic frequencies. Chemical shifts and coupling constants span a large range but sometimes are not readily predictable. The Gutmann-Beckett method uses Et_{3}PO in conjunction with ^{31}P-NMR spectroscopy to assess the Lewis acidity of molecular species.

=== Chemical shifts ===
The ordinary range of chemical shifts ranges from about δ250 to −δ250, which is much wider than typical for ^{1}H-NMR. Unlike ^{1}H-NMR spectroscopy, but similar to most other nuclei, ^{31}P-NMR shifts are primarily not determined by the magnitude of the diamagnetic shielding, but are dominated by the so-called paramagnetic shielding tensor (unrelated to paramagnetism). The paramagnetic shielding tensor, σ_{p}, includes terms that describe the radial expansion (related to charge), energies of excited states, and bond overlap. Illustrative of the effects lead to big changes in chemical shifts, the chemical shifts of the two phosphate esters (MeO)_{3}PO (δ2.1) and (t-BuO)_{3}PO (δ-13.3). More dramatic are the shifts for phosphine derivatives H_{3}P (δ-240), (CH_{3})_{3}P (δ-62), (i-Pr)_{3}P (δ20), and (t-Bu)_{3}P (δ61.9).

=== Coupling constants ===
One-bond coupling is illustrated by PH_{3} where J(P,H) is 189 Hz. Two-bond couplings, e.g. PCH are an order of magnitude smaller. The situation for phosphorus-carbon couplings are more complicated since the two-bond couplings are often larger than one-bond couplings. The J(^{13}C,^{31}P) values for triphenylphosphine are respectively −12.5, 19.6, 6.8, and 0.3 for one-, two-, three-, and four-bond couplings.

=== Historical note ===
The convention surrounding ^{31}P-NMR (and other nuclei) changed convention in 1975: "The dimensionless scale should be defined as positive in the high frequency (low field) direction." Therefore, note that manuscripts published before 1976 will generally have the opposite sign.

== Biomolecular applications ==
^{31}P-NMR spectroscopy is widely used for studies of phospholipid bilayers and biological membranes in native conditions. The analysis of ^{31}P-NMR spectra of lipids could provide a wide range of information about lipid bilayer packing, phase transitions (gel phase, physiological liquid crystal phase, ripple phases, non bilayer phases), lipid head group orientation/dynamics, and elastic properties of pure lipid bilayer and as a result of binding of proteins and other biomolecules.

In addition, a specific N-H...(O)-P experiment (INEPT transfer using three-bond scalar coupling ^{3}J_{N-P}~5 Hz) could provide a direct information about formation of hydrogen bonds between amine protons of protein to phosphate of lipid headgroups, which is useful in studies of protein/membrane interactions.
