= Deuterated acetone =

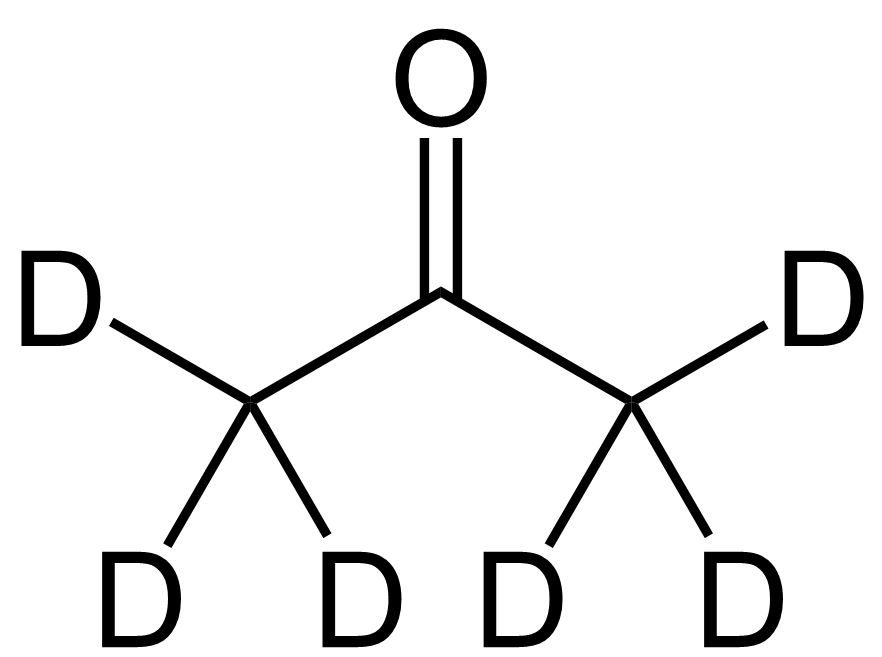
Skeletal formula of deuterated acetone
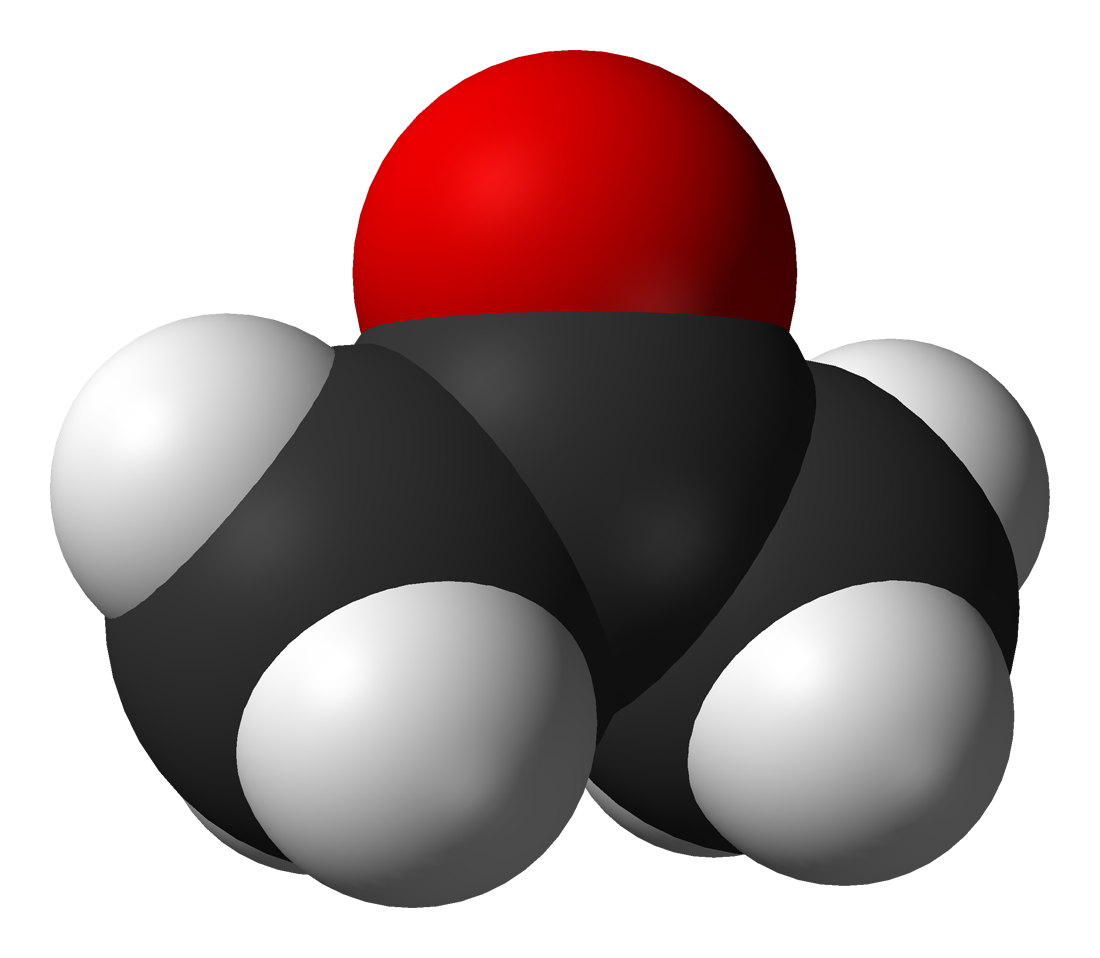
Spacefill model of deuterated acetone
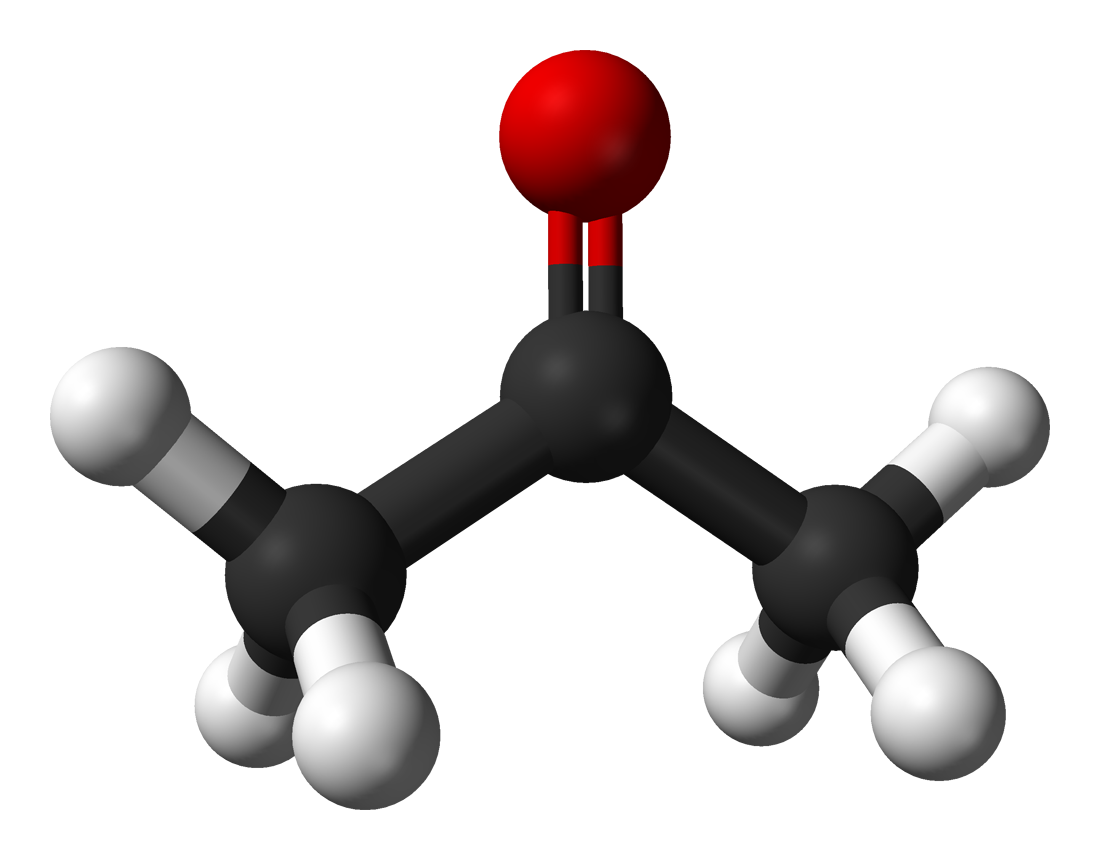
- Skeletal formula of deuterated acetone

Names
- Preferred IUPAC name (1,1,1,3,3,3-^{2}H_{6})Propan-2-one

Identifiers
CAS Number	666-52-4
3D model (JSmol)	Interactive image
Beilstein Reference	1702935
ChEBI	CHEBI:78217
ChemSpider	455535
ECHA InfoCard	100.010.514
EC Number	211-563-9
PubChem CID	522220
UNII	B0N19B53H8
UN number	1090
CompTox Dashboard (EPA)	DTXSID20216767
- InChI: InChI=1S/C3H6O/c1-3(2)4/h1-2H3/i1D3,2D3 Key: CSCPPACGZOOCGX-WFGJKAKNSA-N
- SMILES: [2H]C([2H])([2H])C(=O)C([2H])([2H])[2H]

Properties
Chemical formula	C_{3}^{2}H_{6}O or C_{3}D_{6}O
Molar mass	64.1161 g mol^{−1}
Density	0.872 g cm^{−3}
Melting point	−94 °C (−137 °F; 179 K)
Boiling point	56 °C (133 °F; 329 K)
Vapor pressure	24.5-25.3 kPa (at 20°C)

Hazards
- GHS labelling
Pictograms	(GHS02: Flammable) (GHS07: Exclamation mark)
Signal word	Danger
Hazard statements	H225, H319, H336
Precautionary statements	P210, P233, P240, P241, P242, P243, P261, P264, P271, P280, P303+P361+P353, P304+P340, P305+P351+P338, P312, P337+P313, P370+P378, P403+P233, P403+P235, P405, P501
NFPA 704 (fire diamond)	1 3 0
Flash point	−19 °C (−2 °F; 254 K)

Related compounds
Related compounds	Acetone
- Except where otherwise noted, data are given for materials in their standard state (at 25 °C [77 °F], 100 kPa). Infobox references

Deuterated acetone ((CD_{3})_{2}CO), also known as acetone-d_{6}, is a form (isotopologue) of acetone (CH_{3})_{2}CO in which every hydrogen atom (H) is replaced with deuterium (heavy hydrogen) isotope (^{2}H or D). Deuterated acetone is a common solvent used in NMR spectroscopy.

== Properties ==
As with all deuterated compounds, the properties of deuterated acetone are virtually identical to those of regular acetone.

== Production ==
Deuterated acetone is made by the reaction of acetone with heavy water, ^{2}H_{2}O or D_{2}O, in the presence of a base. In this case, the base used is deuterated lithium hydroxide:

In order to fully deuterate the acetone, the process is repeated several times, distilling off the acetone from the heavy water, and re-running the reaction in a fresh batch of heavy water.
