= List of chemical databases =

This is a list of websites that contain lists of chemicals, or databases of chemical information. There is further detail on the content of these and other resources in a Wikibook of information sources.

Abbreviation	Full name	Operator	Selects	Contains	ID prefix	Quality	Link	Entries
ACToR		Environmental Protection Agency		toxicology information; occurrence			"ACToR". Archived from the original on November 2, 2016.	893,280
AtomWork	Inorganic Material Database	National Institute for Materials Science		crystal structures			"AtomWork".	82,000
Beilstein	Beilstein database	Elsevier	organic compounds	properties			closed access	
BIAdb	Benzylisoquinoline Alkaloid Database						"BIAdb".	846
BindingDB	The Binding Database	Skaggs School of Pharmacy and Pharmaceutical Sciences at the University of California, San Diego	noncovalent association of molecules in solution	ChEMBL SMILES InChiKey targets			"BindingDB".	
BindingMOAD	Binding Mother of All Databases		protein ligand structures				"BindingMOAD".	36047
BMDB	Bovine Metabolome Database	Collaborative Drug Discovery			BMDB	manually selected and checked	"BMDB".	7859
BMRB	Biological Magnetic Resonance Data Bank	University of Wisconsin	biological molecules including ligands, cofactors, peptides, saccharides	NMR spectroscopy			"BMRB".	
BRENDA		Technical University of Braunschweig	enzymes ligands				"BRENDA".	
Carotenoids Database			carotenoids		CA		"Carotenoids".	1195
CCCBDB	Computational Chemistry Comparison and Benchmark DataBase	National Institute of Standards and Technology		gas phase molecules			"CCCDBD"	2069
CCRIS	Chemical Carcinogenesis Research Information System	National Library of Medicine	substances that affect tumors		CCRIS	from primary literature, reviewed by experts	"CCRIS subset of PubChem".	9562
CDD Public			drug candidates				limited access	3,000,000
ChEBI	Chemical Entities of Biological Interest	ELIXIR	small chemical compounds			from PDBeChem ChEMBL KEGG IntEnz	"ChEBI".	60,000
Chematica		Merck	organic chemicals	reaction pathway calculation; Beilstein CAS SMILES			proprietary	7,000,000
ChEMBL	Chemicals from European Molecular Biology Laboratory	EMBL	molecules with drug-like properties				"ChEMBL".	1,961,000
cheML.io		Departments of Computer Science and Chemistry at Nazarbayev University	de novo molecules generated by ML models	SMILES, computed properties		artificially generated	"cheML.io".	2,800,000
ChemDB	chemical database		small molecules				"ChemDB".	5,000,000
Chemical Book		East West University	commercially available compounds	CASno, suppliers, properties			"Chemical Book".	200,000
Chemical Register			from 20,000 vendors	CASno mainly from larger-scale suppliers			"Chemical Register".	1,750,000
ChemIDplus		National Library of Medicine	other NLM databases; regulated substances	CASNo UNII structure	CMNPD			400,000
ChemSpider		Royal Society of Chemistry	from 275 data sources				"ChemSpider".	88,000,000
ChemIndex	chemical database		substances	CAS Search; suppliers			"Chemindex".	
Clival Database	Clinical Trail Database		Clinical Trail Data Solutions	50,000 molecules clinical trail data	Phase 0 to IV indications		"clival".	
CMNPD	Comprehensive Marine Natural Products Database	Peking University	from literature and other databases	structural classification; species	CMNPD	curated	https://www.cmnpd.org/	31,561
COCONUT	the COlleCtion of Open NatUral producTs	Friedrich Schiller University Jena	natural products	species, geolocation	CNP	extracted from open databases	https://coconut.naturalproducts.net/	738,795
COD	Crystallography Open Database	Vilnius University	small molecules (open source)	crystal structure atomic coordinates	COD	curated	"COD".	478,715
	Common Chemistry	American Chemical Society		structure CAS SMILES InCh			https://commonchemistry.cas.org/	~500,000
Compendium of Pesticide Common Names		British Crop Production Council	Pesticides with ISO common names	structure, CASNo, IUPAC name, SMILES, InChI		curated	"Compendium of Pesticide Common Names".	1,800
CompTox	CompTox Chemicals Dashboard	US Environmental Protection Agency	chemicals evaluated for potential health risks				"CompTox". Archived from the original on December 16, 2019.	
CosIng	Cosmetic Ingredients	European Commission	cosmetic ingredients				"CosIng".	
CrystalWorks		Science and Technology Facilities Council					"CrystalWorks".	
CSD	Cambridge Structural Database	Cambridge Crystallographic Data Centre					"CSD".	1,038,250
CSDB	Carbohydrate Structure Database	Zelinsky Institute of Organic Chemistry	carbohydrates	structures references	CSDB ID		"CSDB".	
CTD	Comparative Toxicogenomics Database	Department of Biological Sciences at North Carolina State University		MeSH CASNo ChEBI PubChem genes, pathways			"CTD".	
DDB	Dortmund Data Bank		pure compounds, mixtures, gas hydrates	physical properties			"DDB".	
Dissociation Constants	IUPAC Digitized pKa Dataset	IUPAC		dissociation constants			"Dissociation Constants". GitHub.	
DETHERM		DECHEMA		thermophysical properties			"DETHERM".	75,000
DrugBank		University of Alberta	drugs				"DrugBank".	
DrugCentral		University of New Mexico	pharmaceuticals	products containing substance			"DrugCentral".	
DTP/NCI	DTP Open Compound collection	National Cancer Institute Development Therapeutics Program	Cancer therapeutics	Cancer Chemotherapy National Service Center number			"DTP/NCI".	250,000
ECHA	REACH database	European Chemicals Agency	EINECS ELINCS NLP	CASNo HPhrases pictograms tonnage			"ECHA/REACH".	245,000
EAWAG-BBD	Biocatalysis/Biodegradation Database	Eawag: Swiss Federal Institute of Aquatic Science and Technology		CAS SMILES pubchem pathways			"EAWAG-BBD".	1396
eMolecules			drug screening chemicals	list of suppliers and catalog numbers			"eMolecules".	8,000,000
ENCS	Japanese Existing and New Chemical Substances Inventory		regulated chemicals				"ENCS (in Japanese)".	
Evaluated Kinetic Data		IUPAC	rate constants			curated	"Evaluated Kinetic Data".	
FDA SRS	Food and Drug Administration Substance Registration System	U.S. National Library of Medicine	ingredients in FDA regulated products	UNII inchikey			"FDA SRS".	781,000
FEMA	Flavor Ingredient Library	Flavor and Extract Manufacturers Association		CAS CFR FEMA number			"FEMA".	
FooDB	Food Database	University of Alberta	Food components and additives				"FooDB".	70926
GlyTouCan	international glycan structure repository	Ministry of Education, Culture, Sports, Science & Technology	glycans	WURCS GlycoCT PubChem CID	G		"Glycan Repository".	122194
Gmelin	Gmelin database	Elsevier	inorganic and organometallic compounds				closed access	1,500,000
G-SRS	Global Substance Registration System			CAS PubChem ChEMBL INN UNII			"G-SRS".	109,260
GMD	Golm Metabolome Database		GC/MS of metabolites				"GMD".	
	Guide to PHARMACOLOGY	IUPHAR	drugs and targets	INN CAS ChEBI ChEMBL DrugBank PubChem			"Guide to PHARMACOLOGY".	
Henry's law constants		Max Planck Institute for Chemistry	volatile compounds	Henry's law constants		from literature	"Henry's law constants".	46434
HMDB	Human Metabolome Database	Genome Canada	metabolites found in the human body	biochemical data, clinical data	HMDB		"HMDB".	114,222
HugeMDB	Huge Molecular Database	Elegant Mathematics LLC	Small molecules (most of entries have <100 atoms)	major conformers with its 3D and easy search on them	M	good correlated with PubChem on data that is available on PubChem	"HugeMDB".	102 million
ICSC	ILO International Chemical Safety Cards	International Labour Organization		CAS, EC number, UNnumber			"ICSC".	1784
ICSD	Inorganic Crystal Structure Database	FIZ Karlsruhe GmbH					"ICSD".	161,030
IEDB	Immune Epitope Database	National Institute of Allergy and Infectious Diseases	Epitopes mainly peptides and carbohydrates				"IEDB".	3,002 non-peptides
ILThermo	Ionic liquids Database	National Institute of Standards and Technology	ionic liquids including their solutions and mixtures	physical properties			"ILThermo".	3041
	IUPAC-NIST Solubility Database						https://srdata.nist.gov/solubility/index.aspx	67,500
JECDB	Japan Existing Chemical Database			CAS EINECS RTECS SDBS TSCA graph of number of articles per year			"JECDB".	
J-GLOBAL	Nikaji	Japan Science and Technology Agency					"J-GLOBAL".	
KEGG	Kyoto Encyclopedia of Genes and Genomes	Kyoto University Bioinformatics Center	Compounds Glycans (also enzymes, reactions, pathways)	CAS ChEBI ChEMBL MASSBANK NIKKAJI PubChem PDB-CCD			"KEGG".	
K_{i} Database		PDSP		ligand binding			"Ki Database".	
KNApSAcK		Nara Institute of Science and Technology		InChI CAS SMILES organisms	C00		"KNApSAcK".	
LINCS	Library of Integrated Network-based Cellular Signatures		small molecules	PubChem ChEMBL SMILES InChI	LSM		"LINCS".	43,700
LipidBank		Japanese Conference on the Biochemistry of Lipids	lipids				"LipidBank".	7,009
LMSD	LIPID MAPS Structure Database		Lipids	HMDB ChEBI PubChem InChI	LMFA		"LMSD".	44701
LOLI	List of Lists			safety data sheets, regulation			"LOLI".	
Mcule			supplied chemicals	InChI, SMILES, SDF, physichochemical properties			"Mcule".	45,000,000
MediaDB		Institute for Systems Biology	growth media				"MediaDB".	288
Merck Index		Royal Society of Chemistry	drugs				"Merck-Index".	11,500
MeSH	Medical Subject Headings	US National Library of Medicine	biomedical thesaurus	hierarchy of descriptors to literature with MeSH ID			"MeSH".	
MetaCyc		SRI International	metabolic pathways; metabolites				"MetaCyc".	
MetaboLights		EMBL-EBI			MTBL		"MetaboLights".	
MetaNetX		SIB Swiss Institute of Bioinformatics	metabolic networks, metabolites, biochemical reactions, cellular compartments	metabolic models, SBML, InChI, InChIKey, SMILES	MNXM	unified namespace for metabolites and biochemical reactions in the context of metabolic models	"MetaNetX".	240 metabolic models, 1292154 metabolites, 74613 reactions, 44 compartments
METLIN	Metabolite and Chemical Entity Database		tandem mass spectrometry of metabolites				"METLIN".	960,000
MINAS	Metal Ions in Nucleic AcidS	University of Zurich					https://www.minas.uzh.ch/	
ModelSeed			KEGG MetaCyc metabolic pathways		CPD		"ModelSeed".	
MolPort			catalog chemicals				"MolPort".	
MoNA	Mass Bank of North America		mass spectra	splash legg chemspider pubchem chebi CAS			"MoNA".	200,000
npatlas	The Natural Products Atlas	Simon Fraser University	microbial and fungal products	smiles, organism	NPA		npatlas	33434
NIOSH pocket guide	NIOSH Pocket Guide to Chemical Hazards	National Institute for Occupational Safety and Health	commonly used chemicals	exposure limits			"NIOSH". 2 August 2024.	677
NIST Webbook	NIST Chemistry Webbook	National Institute of Standards and Technology		spectra CAS ionization energy mass spectrum, InChI	C+CAS		"NIST Webbook".	
NMRShiftDB		University of Cologne	organic	nuclear magnetic resonance spectra			"NMRShiftDB".	43,581
NORMAN SLE	NORMAN Suspect List Exchange		environmental monitoring				"NORMAN SLE".	110,000
OMG	Open Macromolecular Genome	Jackson group at University of Illinois at Urbana-Champaign	synthetically accessible linear homopolymers	SMILES of linear homopolymers			Github / Zenodo	12,886,131
ORD	Open Reaction Database	ORD consortium	Organic reactions	machine-readable reaction schemes			"ORD"	2,000,000
OrgSyn	Organic Syntheses	Organic Syntheses, Inc.	Reliable chemical reactions	Searchable experimental procedures		Peer-reviewed	"OrgSyn search".	
PDB PDBe	Protein Data Bank in Europe	EMBL-EBI	has some chemicals as well as proteins				"PDBe".	
PATENTSCOPE		WIPO					"PATENTSCOPE".	16,000,000
PDB	RSCB Protein Data Bank						"PDB".	166,891
PharmGKB		Shriram Center for Bioengineering and Chemical Engineering	drugs targets	prescribing info		curated	"PharmGKB".	
PHAROS	Illuminating the Druggable Genome	National Institutes of Health	drug ligands; targets				https://pharos.nih.gov/	355932 ligands 20412 targets
Phenol-Explorer			polyphenols found in food				"Phenol-Explorer".	500
Phosida	PHOsphorylation SIte DAtabase		protein modifications				"Phosida".	
PoLyInfo	Polymer Database	National Institute for Materials Science		physical properties			"PoLyInfo".	26,000
PPDB	Pesticide Properties Database	Agriculture & Environment Research Unit, University of Hertfordshire	Pesticides and their metabolites	Chemical structure, physicochemical properties, human health and ecotoxicological data		curated	"PPDB".	2000
Probes and Drugs								
ProCarDB	Prokaryotic Bacterial Carotenoid DataBase	IMTECH		spectra references			"ProCarDB".	1800
PubChem		National Library of Medicine National Center for Biotechnology Information	from 748 data sources	Structures, Names and Identifiers, Chemical and Physical Properties, Spectral Information, Related Records, Chemical Vendors, Pharmacology and Biochemistry, Use and Manufacturing, Safety and Hazards, Toxicity, Literature, Patents, Biomolecular Interactions and Pathways, Biological Test Results			"PubChem".	103,000,000
Reaxys		Elsevier	chemical compounds	Searchable chemical reactions			"About Reaxys".	118,000,000
Ref-DB	Re-referenced Protein Chemical shift Database		proteins from BioMagResBank	Re-referenced NMR shift			"Ref-DB".	2162
Rhea		Swiss Institute of Bioinformatics	biochemical reactions	ChEBI		curated	"Rhea".	
RÖMPP		Thieme Gruppe					"RÖMPP".	
RTECS	Registry of Toxic Effects of Chemical Substances	Dassault Systèmes		Toxicity, Literature			"Biovia-RTECS". 8 September 2023.	160,000
RxNav		U.S. National Library of Medicine	drugs	interactions			"RxNav".	
Saguaro Chem	Saguaro Chem	"De Novo Chem".	Chemical compounds, reactions, and characterization data from peer reviewed and patent literature	Chemical structures, reaction, annotated procedures, text procedures, characterization data, bibliographic metadata			"SaguaroChem". 15 August 2026.	13,000,000+ reaction passages
SciFinder		Chemical Abstracts Service of American Chemical Society	organic, inorganic chemicals, proteins	CASNo			paid access only	130,000,000
ScrubChem						scraped from PubChem	"ScrubChem".	2,282,992
SDBS	Spectral Database for Organic Compounds	National Institute of Advanced Industrial Science and Technology (AIST), Japan	Organic compounds	Spectra:IR Raman MASS ESR ^{1}H NMR ^{13}C NMR	SDBS No	curated	"SDBS".	34,000
	Serum Metabolome Database	The Metabolomics Innovation Centre	found in blood serum				"Serum Metabolome DB".	4,651
Solvent Selection Tool		ACS Green Chemistry Institute	Solvents	Principal components analysis of physical properties		curated	"Solvent Selection Tool".	272
SPRESI^{web}		InfoChem Gesellschaft für chemische Information mbH	organic molecules and reactions	organic structures		from literature	"SPRESI".	5,800,000
SpringerMaterials		Springer	solid materials	CAS InChI physical properties		from literature	"SpringerMaterials".	155,165 + 494,942
STITCH		EMBL	from Biocarta, BioCyc, GO, KEGG, and Reactome	Chemical-Protein Interactions		curated and predicted	"STITCH".	500,000
SuperDRUG2		Structural Bioinformatics Group	drugs targets	targets, dose, side effects, Canonical SMILES, Standard InChI, Standard InChIKey, DrugBank, ChEMBL, DrugCentral, KEGG, PubChem, CASRN	SD		"SuperDRUG2".	4,600
	Super Natural II		natural product chemicals	SMILES vendors	SN00		"Super Natural II".	325,508
SureChEMBL		European Molecular Biology Laboratory	substances in patents	patent text			"SureChEMBL".	
SwissLipids		Swiss Institute of Bioinformatics	lipids		SLM:		"SwissLipids".	
TDR Targets	Tropical Disease Research	Trypanosomatics Laboratory	drugs and targets				"TDR Targets".	2,000,000
TTD	Therapeutic Targets Database	Zhejiang University	drugs and targets	SMILES InChI CAS PubChem			"TTD".	37,316
T3DB	Toxin and Toxin-Target Database Toxic Exposome Database	University of Alberta	toxins and toxin targets		T3D		"T3DB".	3,678
UniChem		EMBL-EBI	pointers to existing chemicals; indexes 41 databases	Structure; StdInChI; links to databases		automated loads	""Compound Sources Search"".	>2000000
UniProt	UniProt Knowledgebase		proteins	sequence, modifications, location, organism, similar			"UniProt".	
US DOT	US Department of transport	Emergency response guidebook DOT + others	bulk transported chemicals	UNnumber United Nations ID number, hazard response guide			"Emergency response guidebook" (PDF).	3000
UV/VIS Spectral Atlas	The MPI-Mainz UV/VIS spectral atlas of gaseous molecules of atmospheric interest	Max Planck Institute for Chemistry	gaseous molecules	absorption cross sections		from literature	"UV/VIS Spectral Atlas".	7313
YMDB	Yeast Metabolome Database	The Metabolomics Innovation Centre	metabolites of yeast	48 data fields	YMDB		"YMDB".	16042
ZINC	ZINC is not commercial	University of California, San Francisco	purchasable substances	EPA DSS TOX, ChEMBL, HMDB, KEGG, PDB, SMILES			"ZINC".	37 billion
