= Nuclear magnetic resonance spectra database =

A nuclear magnetic resonance spectra database is an electronic repository of information concerning Nuclear magnetic resonance (NMR) spectra. Such repositories can be downloaded as self-contained data sets or used online. The form in which the data is stored varies, ranging from line lists that can be graphically displayed to raw free induction decay (FID) data. Data is usually annotated in a way that correlates the spectral data with the related molecular structure.

== Data format ==
=== Line list ===
The form in which most NMR is described in literature papers. It is common for databases to display line lists graphically in a manner that is similar to how processed spectra might appear. These line list however lack first and higher order splitting, satellites from low abundance isotopes like carbon or platinum, as well as the information concerning line width and other informative aspects of line shape. The advantage of a line list is that it requires a minimal amount of memory.

=== Processed image ===
Once an FID is processed into a spectrum it can be converted into an image that usually takes up less memory than the FID. This method requires more memory than a line list but supplies the user with considerably more information. The processed image has less information that a raw FID but it also take less memory and is easily displayed in browsers and requires no specialty data handling software.

=== Raw FID file ===
The raw free induction decay data obtained when performing the experiment are stored according to the formatting preferences of the instrument manufacturer. This data format contains the most information and requires the most storage space. A variety of commercial and free of software programs allow users to process FID data into useful spectra once FID data is downloaded.

== Common search methods ==
Some database search methods are commonly available:

- Compound name — May include official IUPAC names and common names.
- Molecular formula — Either an exact formula or a range.
- Molecular structure — This method requires a molecular editor interface.
- Registration number — Commonly the CAS Registry Number but most databases also have their own numbering scheme.
- Peak range or other spectral characteristics — The user numerically enters data related to a spectra of an unknown compound. This data is used to for compounds which share the shifts within specified constraints. This allows users to locate the exact compound or molecules with similar functional groups.
- Spectra search — Software is used to search a database for spectra that resemble the a submitted spectra.

== List of databases ==
The following is a partial list of nuclear magnetic resonance spectra databases:

=== ACD/Labs ===
Advanced Chemistry Development (ACD/labs) is a chemoinformatics company which produces software for use in handling NMR data and predicting NMR spectra. ACD/Labs offers the Aldrich library as an add-on to their general spectrum processing software and specialized NMR software products. The NMR predictors allow improving the prediction of NMR spectra by adding data to user training databases. The content databases used to train the prediction algorithms (HNMR DB, CNMR DB, FNMR DB, NNMR DB, and PNMR DB) also include references to instruments and literature. These databases can be either purchased or leased as libraries through individual or group contracts.

=== Aldrich NMR Library ===
A portion of this database is still available in a three volume print version from Aldrich. The full electronic version includes a supplement of spectra not included in the paper version. In all, this database includes more than 15,000 compounds with the associated 300 MHz ^{1}H and 75 MHz ^{13}C spectra. The product includes the software necessary to view and handle the NMR data. This database can be purchased as a library through individual or group contracts. The spectra data appear to be stored as images of processed FID data.

=== Biological Magnetic Resonance Data Bank ===
The Biological Magnetic Resonance Data Bank (BioMagResBank or BMRB) is sponsored by the Department of Biochemistry at the University of Wisconsin–Madison; it is dedicated to Proteins, Peptides, Nucleic Acids, and other Biomolecules. It stores a large variety of raw NMR data.

=== Wiley's KnowItAll NMR Spectral Library ===
Wiley offers a comprehensive collection of spectral data, including their Sadtler standard spectra. Their collection of NMR spectral data can be searched or used to build predictions; it includes CNMR, HNMR, and XNMR (F-19 NMR, P-31 NMR, N-15 NMR, etc.) spectra.

=== ChemGate ===
A database that was developed and maintained by the publisher John Wiley & Sons. This database included more than 700,000 NMR, IR and MS Spectra, statistics specific to the NMR spectra are not listed. The NMR data includes ^{1}H,^{13}C, ^{11}B, ^{15}N, ^{17}O, ^{19}F, ^{29}Si, and ^{31}P. The data were in the form of graphically displayed line lists. Access to the database could be purchased piecemeal or leased as the entire library through individual or group contracts. These data are now made available through Wiley Online Library.

=== ChemSpider ===
The ChemSpider chemical database accepts user submitted raw NMR data. The data in accepted in the JCAMP-DX format which can be actively viewed online with the JSpecView applet or the data can be downloaded for processing with other software packages.

=== NMRShiftDB ===
The NMRDShiftDB features a graphically displayed line list data. The data are hosted by Cologne University. Online access is free and user participation is encouraged. The data are available under the GNU FDL license. Contained 53972 measured spectra of, among other nuclei, ^{13}C, ^{1}H, ^{15}N, ^{11}B, ^{19}F, ^{29}Si, and ^{31}P NMR as of March 4, 2021.

=== SpecInfo on the Internet ===
Available through Wiley Online Library (John Wiley & Sons), SpecInfo on the Internet NMR is a collection of approximately 440,000 NMR spectra (organized as ^{13}C, ^{1}H, ^{19}F, ^{31}P, and ^{29}Si NMR databases). The data are accessed via the Internet using a Java interface and are stored in a server developed jointly with BASF. The software includes PDF report generation, spectrum prediction (database-trained and/or algorithm based), structure drawing, structure search, spectrum search, text field search, and more. Access to the databases is available to subscribers either as NMR only or combined with mass spectrometry and FT-IR data. Many of these data were also made available via ChemGate, described below. Coverage can be freely verified at Compound Search. A smaller collection of these data is still available via STN International.

=== Spectral Database for Organic Compounds ===
The Spectral Database for Organic Compounds (SDBS) is developed and maintained by Japan's National Institute of Advanced Industrial Science and Technology. SDBS includes 14700 ^{1}H NMR spectra and 13000 ^{13}C NMR spectra as well as FT-IR, Raman, ESR, and MS data. The data are stored and displayed as an image of the processed data. Annotation is achieved by a list of the chemical shifts correlated to letters which are also used to label a molecular line drawing. Access to the database is available free of charge for noncommercial use. Users are requested not to download more than 50 spectra and/or compound information in one day. Between 1997 and February 2008 the database has been accessed more than 200 million times. T. Saito, K. Hayamizu, M. Yanagisawa and O. Yamamoto are attributed reproducibility for the NMR data.

== See also ==
- Chemical database
- NMR spectroscopy
