= Gmelin database =

German handbook/encyclopedia of inorganic compounds initiated by Leopold Gmelin

The Gmelin database is a large database of organometallic and inorganic compounds updated quarterly. It is based on the German publication Gmelins Handbuch der anorganischen Chemie ("Gmelin's Handbook of Inorganic Chemistry") which was originally published by Leopold Gmelin in 1817; the last print edition, the 8th, appeared in the 1990s. Although published over many decades, the printed series was not uniform in coverage or currency. Some elements are represented only by decades-old and not updated slim summary volumes. Others (Fe, B, S, F, U, etc.) have numerous supplements. Most later supplement volumes focused on an element's organic complexes. Each volume lists its literature coverage date.

The database currently contains every compound/reaction discovered between 1772 and 1995, amounting to 1.5 million compounds and 1.3 million different reactions, with over 85,000 titles, keywords and abstracts. It has over 800 different data fields on subjects such as the compounds' electric, magnetic, thermal, crystal and physiological information.

The Gmelin database is maintained by Elsevier MDL. It is the sister database to the Beilstein database, which deals with organic chemicals and reactions; both are now part of the Reaxys system. The Gmelin database is less complete and less up-to-date than the handbook; the printed book is consequently kept available.
