= Moiety =

Moiety may refer to:

== Anthropology ==
- Moiety (kinship), either of two groups into which a society is divided
  - A division of society in the Haudenosaunee societal structure in North America
  - An Australian Aboriginal kinship group
  - Native Hawaiian realm ruled by a mo'i or an ali'i

== Chemistry ==
- Moiety (chemistry), a part or functional group of a molecule
  - Moiety conservation, conservation of a subgroup in a chemical species

== Other uses ==
- Moiety, a 2012 album by Keith Kenniff (as Helios)
- Moiety, a rebel group in the computer game Riven

== See also ==
- Moiety title, ownership of part of a property
