= SS Minas =

SS Minas is the name of the following ships:

- SS Minas (1891), sunk by SM U-39 on 15 February 1917
- SS Minas (1892), sunk by SM U-34 on 2 December 1917

== See also ==
- HMCS Minas
- Minas (disambiguation)
