= SDBS =

SDBS may refer to:

- Spectral Database for Organic Compounds
- Sodium dodecylbenzene sulfonate
