= Minas =

Minas or MINAS may refer to:

== People with the given name Minas ==
- Menas of Ethiopia (died 1563)
- Saint Menas (Minas, 285–309)
- Minias of Florence (Minas, Miniato, died 250)
- Minas Alozidis (born 1984), Greek hurdler
- Minas Avetisyan (1928–1975)
- Minas Hantzidis (born 1966), Greek footballer
- Minas Hadjimichael (born 1956), Permanent Representative to the United Nations for Cyprus
- Minas Hatzisavvas (1948–2015), Greek actor
- Minas of Aksum, 6th-century bishop

== People with the surname Minas ==
- Iskouhi Minas (1884–1951), French poet and writer of Armenian descent.

== Places ==
- Minas Gerais, Brazil
- Minas, Uruguay
- Minas Department, Córdoba, Argentina
- Minas Department, Neuquén, Argentina
- Minas, Cuba, a municipality in Cuba
- Minas, Iran, a village in West Azerbaijan Province, Iran
- Minas Basin in Nova Scotia
- Les Mines, a former Acadian community on the shores of the Minas Basin (called Minas or Mines in English)

== Other uses ==
- Minas (band), an American bossa nova band
- Minas cheese
- Minas (game contract), a contract in the card game of Schafkopf
- Minas Tênis Clube, a social and sports club from Belo Horizonte, Brazil
- MINAS, a biochemistry database
- Minas, a Cablebús station in Mexico City
- Minas Tirith, fictional city in Lord of the Rings

== Mina ==
- Mina (unit), an ancient Near Eastern unit of weight, and hence, also unit of currency
- Mina (Sikhism), a sect of Sikhism

== See also ==
- Mina (disambiguation)
