= Phospho3D =

Content
- Description: 3D structures of phosphorylation sites.

Contact
- Laboratory: Institute for Research in Biomedicine
- Authors: Andreas Zanzoni
- Primary citation: Zanzoni & al. (2011)
- Release date: 2010

Access
- Website: http://www.phospho3d.org/.

Phospho3D is a database of 3D structures of phosphorylation sites derived from Phospho.ELM.

== See also ==
- Phospho.ELM
- Protein structure
