= Symyx Technologies =

Symyx Technologies, Inc.
- Type: Public
- Traded as: Nasdaq: SMMX
- Industry: Life Sciences; Chemical and Energy and Performance; Materials and Consumer Products
- Founded: 1994; 32 years ago
- Successor: Spinoff: Freeslate, Inc.; Merged: Accelrys
- Headquarters: Santa Clara, California United States
- Key people: Isy Goldwasser (CEO); Steven D. Goldby (executive chairman); Rex S. Jackson (EVP and General Counsel); W. Henry Weinberg PhD (EVP and CTO); Luigi Berini (CEO of Symyx Technologies Europe)
- Products: Electronic lab notebook and R&D execution and analysis software, lab automation and breakthrough materials technology
- Number of employees: 400
- Website: accelrys.com//

Symyx Technologies, Inc. was a company that specialized in informatics and automation products. Symyx provided software solutions for scientific research, including Enterprise Laboratory Notebooks and products for combinatorial chemistry. The software part of the business became part of Accelrys, Inc. in 2010, and in 2014, the company merged with Dassault Systèmes. Symyx also offered laboratory robotics systems for performing automated chemical research, which in 2010 was spun out as Freeslate, Inc.

== Products ==
Symyx offered high-speed combinatorial technologies for the discovery of new materials. Using proprietary technologies - including instruments, software and methods - Symyx was able to generate hundreds to thousands of unique materials at a time and screen those materials rapidly and automatically for desired properties. This approach was said to deliver results hundreds to thousands of times faster than traditional research methods, at a fraction of the cost. Symyx applied this technology to revolutionize materials discovery in the life sciences, chemical, and electronics industries.

== History ==
Founded in 1994 by Dr. Alejandro Zaffaroni and Dr. Peter G. Schultz, Symyx' conceptual basis drew from Affymax, Inc. and Affymetrix, Inc., which commercialized the use of high-speed combinatorial methods for pharmaceutical and genetic research, respectively. Dr. Eric McFarland, professor at UCSB, was the founding director. Symyx screens about a million materials a year and has produced a product pipeline with several materials that have the potential to be commercialized in the next few years. Examples of their discovery efforts include X-ray storage phosphors for radiography, polymers to speed DNA research and catalysts for the manufacture of pharmaceuticals, chemicals and plastics.

In 2004, Symyx Technologies acquired Intellichem, a software manufacturer for electronic laboratory notebooks and, in 2007 Symyx Technologies acquired MDL Information Systems (originally Molecular Design Limited, Inc.), a provider of R&D informatics in the chemistry and life sciences industries, which had been launched as a computer-aided drug design firm in January 1978. With this purchase came the purveyorship of the Centers for Disease Control and Prevention-NIOSH Registry of Toxic Effects of Chemical Substances (RTECS, www.cdc.gov/niosh/rtecs), a database of basic toxicity information on household chemical substances, food additives, drugs, solvents, biocides, and chemical waste components which as of first quarter of 2012 contained ≈170,000 entries. In 2008, Symyx sold non-RTECS portions of the occupational health and safety (OHS) component of the MDL business to ChemAdvisor, Inc., of Pittsburgh, Pennsylvania. Subsequent innovations derived from these business components included an enterprise electronic laboratory notebook (ELN) capable of supporting multiple scientific disciplines.

In 2010 Symyx spun off their laboratory robotics business as Freeslate, Inc. Freeslate developed high throughput systems for automating chemical research. In 2010, the remaining Symyx software business merged with Accelrys, with the combined company being known simply as Accelrys. In 2014, Accelrys in turn merged with Dassault Systèmes, who announced the creation of the BIOVIA brand to supply software for scientific applications.

== Business model considerations ==
The concept of combinatory chemistry (outside of bio-tech area) was the focus of Symyx. The initial Symyx business model was to provide contract research for large chemical companies at a contract size from $0.5 Million to $200 Million. The company had initial success in gaining enough contracts to reach profitability, with small deals with few initial customers which led to large deals, such as with Exxon. Symyx then started to sell equipment.

One other key point was the company had to develop new tools and hire new people when a new project came up because the contract was in a brand new research area and required different expertise. Therefore, the research contract business was not scalable. This is seen as the reason for company failure, even though the company had over 500 patents. Other companies followed Symyx's path. Intermolecular licensed Symyx patents on electronic materials and is developing tools for the electronic materials companies.
