= RCIS =

There are multiple organizations called RCIS, including the Royal Canadian Institute for Science in Toronto, Canada, and the Research Center for Information Security (情報セキュリティ研究センター, Jōhō Sekyuriti Kenkyū Sentā), currently located in Akihabara, Tokyo, Japan, a research unit of National Institute of Advanced Industrial Science and Technology (AIST, 産業総合技術研究所).

== Organization ==
Currently, there are more than 40 international researchers in Research Center for Information Security, divided into four research teams.

- Research Team for Security Fundamentals
- Research Team for Physical Analysis
- Research Team for Software Security
- Research Team for Hardware Security
- ICSS Technology Team

== See also ==
- Research topics
