= MetaNetX =

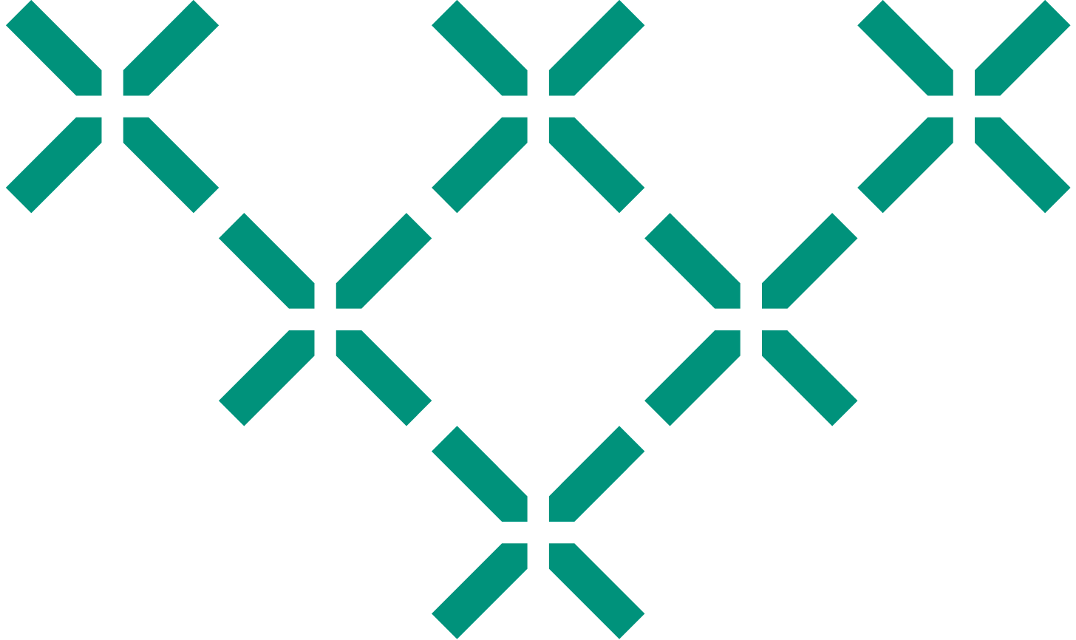

Content
- Description: Unified namespace for metabolites and biochemical reactions in the context of metabolic models
- Data types captured: Small chemical compounds, biochemical reactions, cellular compartments, genome-scale metabolic models

Contact
- Research center: SIB Swiss Institute of Bioinformatics; Vital-IT group
- Primary citation: PMID 33156326
- Release date: June 2011

Access
- Website: www.metanetx.org
- Download URL: www.metanetx.org/mnxdoc/mnxref.html
- Sparql endpoint: rdf.metanetx.org

Tools
- Web: Import and map models MNXref ID mapper

Miscellaneous
- License: CC BY 4.0
- Version: 4.5

MetaNetX is a database maintained by the SIB Swiss Institute of Bioinformatics for the automated model construction, and the genome annotation for large-scale metabolic networks. MetaNetX provides a number of tools to access, analyse and manipulate metabolic networks.

MetaNetX provides a bunch of pre-mapped metabolic models.

To ease model comparison, MetaNetX has developed a resource to unify metabolites and biochemical reactions in the context of metabolic models. This unified namespace is called MetaNetX/MNXref.

MNXref reconciles chemical compounds by structural similarity and biochemical reaction context. Then reconciles biochemical reactions on the basis of the chemical compound reconciliation in an iterative way. Each reconciled group of chemical compounds, biochemical reactions and cellular compartments is a bag of similar items. MNXref sets a referent for each group.

MetaNetX allows search in MNXref by chemical compounds, biochemical reactions and cellular compartments.

Currently, MetaNetX/MNXref reconciles those resources:

- BiGG
- ChEBI
- enviPath
- HMDB
- GO
- KEGG
- LipidMaps
- MetaCyc
- Reactome
- Rhea
- SABIO-RK
- SwissLipids
- The SEED
- VMH
