= Chemical Abstracts Service =

Division of the American Chemical Society

- Formation: 1907
- Headquarters: Columbus, Ohio
- Location: United States
- Official language: English
- President: Vacant
- Website: www.cas.org

CAS (Chemical Abstracts Service) is a division of the American Chemical Society. It is a source of chemical information and is located in Columbus, Ohio, United States.

== Print periodicals ==
Chemical Abstracts
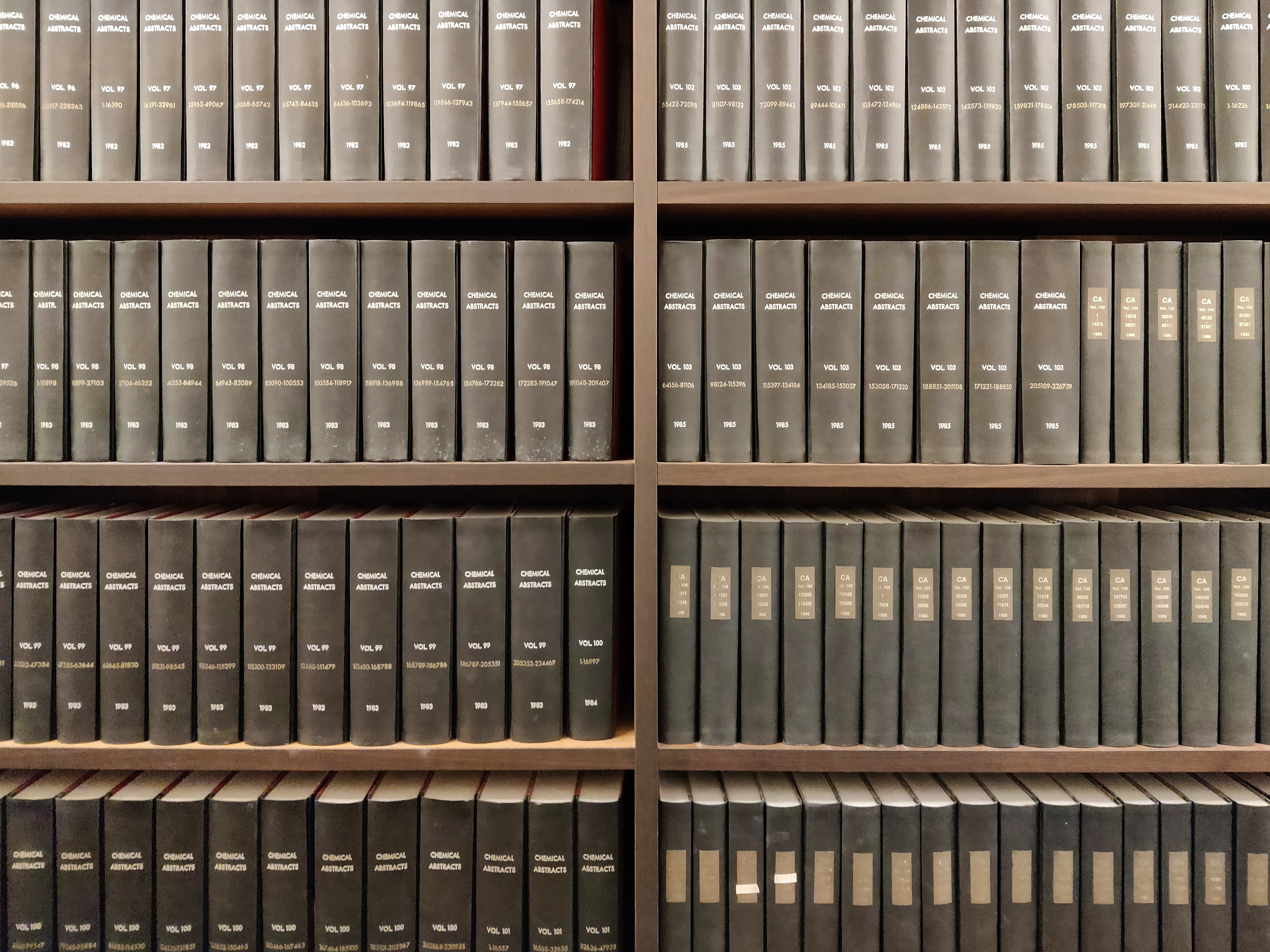
- Discipline: Chemistry (index)
- Language: English

Publication details
- History: 1907–2010
- Publisher: Chemical Abstracts Service (United States)
- Frequency: Weekly

Standard abbreviations
- ISO 4: Chem. Abstr.

Indexing
- CODEN: CHABA8
- ISSN: 0009-2258
- LCCN: 09004698
- OCLC no.: 1553947

Links
- Journal homepage

Chemical Abstracts is a periodical index that provides numerous tools such as SciFinder as well as tagged keywords, summaries, indexes of disclosures, and structures of compounds in recently published scientific documents. Approximately 8,000 journals, technical reports, dissertations, conference proceedings, and new books, available in at least 50 different languages, are monitored yearly, as are patent specifications from 27 countries and two international organizations. Chemical Abstracts ceased print publication on January 1, 2010.

== Databases ==
The two principal databases that support the different products are CAplus and Registry.

=== CAS References ===
CAS References consists of bibliographic information and abstracts for all articles in chemical journals worldwide, and chemistry-related articles from all scientific journals, patents, and other scientific publications.

=== Registry ===
As of 2023, the CAS Registry contains information on more than 200 million organic and inorganic substances, and about 70 million protein and nucleic acid sequences. The sequence information comes from CAS and GenBank, produced by the National Institutes of Health. The chemical information is produced by CAS, and is prepared by the CAS Registry System, which identifies each compound with a specific CAS registry number, index name, and graphic representation of its chemical structure.

The assignment of chemical names is done according to the chemical nomenclature rules for CA index names, which is slightly different from the internationally standard IUPAC names, according to the rules of IUPAC.

== Products ==
CAS databases are available via two principal database systems, STN, and SciFinder.

=== STN ===
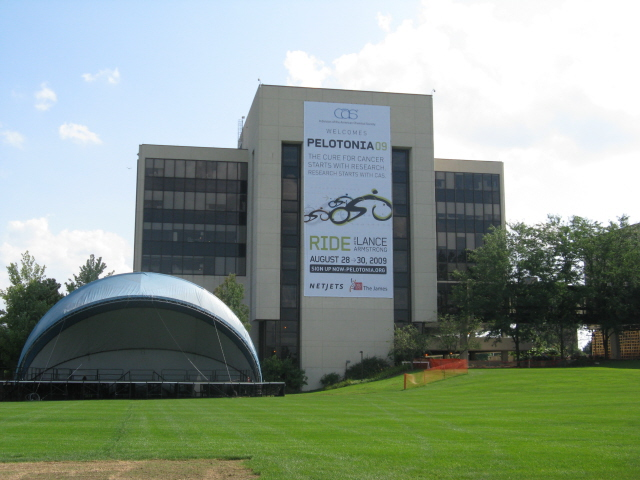
Chemical Abstracts Service Building B in August 2009. Columbus, Ohio

STN (Scientific & Technical Information Network) International is operated jointly by CAS and FIZ Karlsruhe, and is intended primarily for information professionals, using a command language interface. In addition to CAS databases, STN also provides access to many other databases, similar to Dialog.

=== SciFinder ===
SciFinder is a database of chemical and bibliographic information. Originally it was available only as a client application (for both Windows and MacOS operating systems), a web version was released in 2008. By that time it had a graphical interface, and was able to do graphical searches for chemical structures and reactions (the first database to allow such functions), as well as keyword searches for literature in chemistry and related disciplines. SciFinder Scholar was a very similar a product developed for academic institutions, but discontinued in 2023. In 2017 the ACS released SciFinder-n as a web-only product with the same data content and improved user interface and search functions.

SciFinder is one of the largest databases of chemical information worldwide, with a larger number of relevant information sources than many of it's competitors. However, due to its unique and unusual search functions, substantial training is needed in order to fully take advantage of SciFinder capabilities.

=== CASSI ===
CASSI stands for Chemical Abstracts Service Source Index. Since 2009, this formerly print and CD-ROM compilation is available as a free online resource to look up and confirm publication information. The online CASSI Search Tool provides titles and abbreviations, CODEN, ISSN, publisher, and date of first issue (history) for a selected journal. Also included is its language of text and language of summaries.

The range is from 1907 to the present, including both serial and non-serial scientific and technical publications. The database is updated quarterly. Beyond CASSI lists abbreviated journal titles from early chemical literature and other historical reference sources.

== History ==
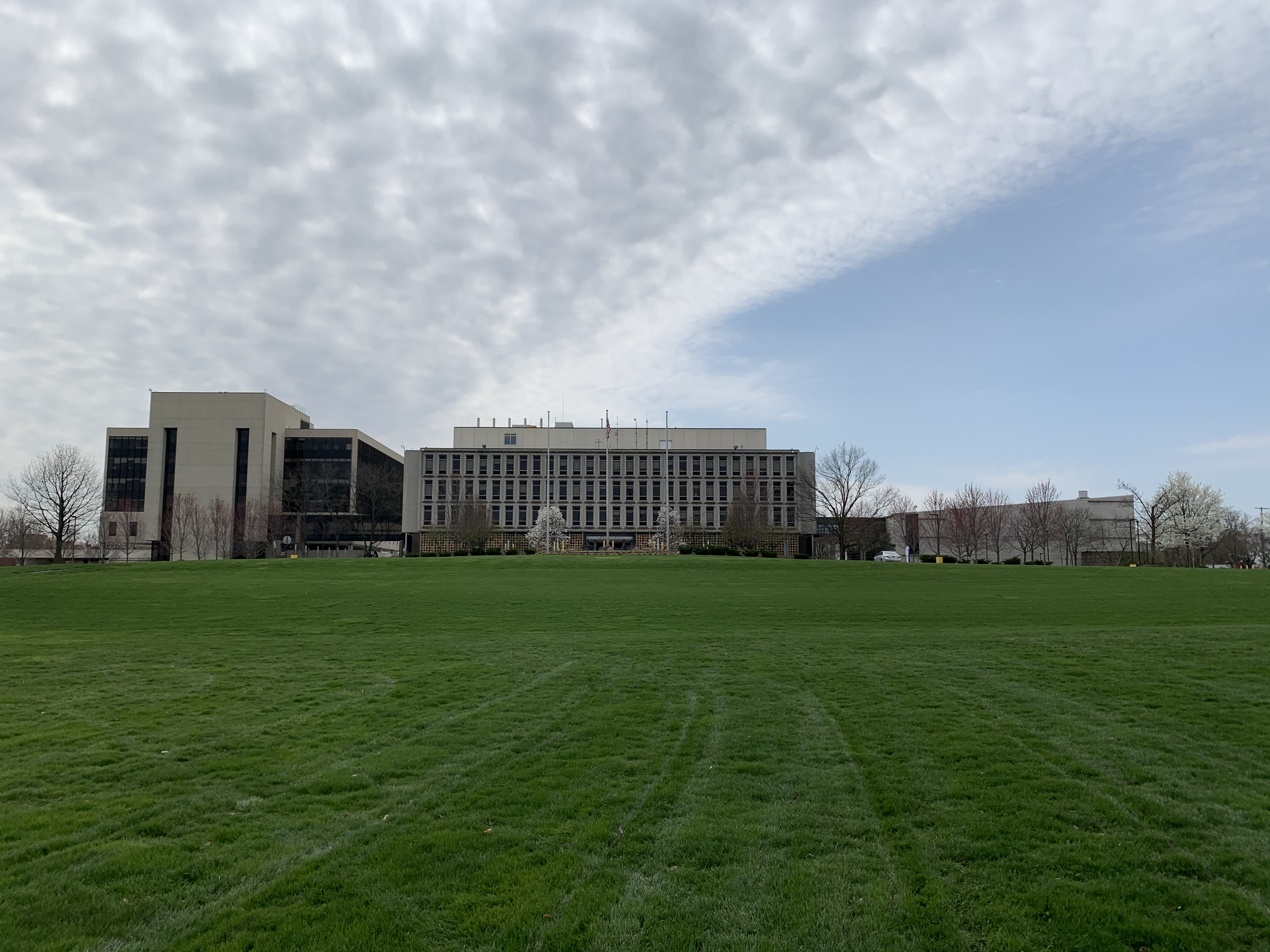
CAS Headquarters Complex, completed in 1965 with additions (on left and right) in 1973 and 2001. Columbus, Ohio

Chemical Abstracts (CA) began as a volunteer effort and developed from there. The use of volunteer abstractors was phased out in 1994. Chemical Abstracts has been associated with the American Chemical Society in one way or another since 1907.

For many years, beginning in 1909, the offices of Chemical Abstracts were housed in various places on the Columbus, Ohio campus of Ohio State University, including McPherson Laboratory and Watts Hall. In 1965, CAS moved to a new 50-acre (200,000 m^{2}) site on the west bank of the Olentangy River, just north of The Ohio State campus. This campus became well known in the Columbus area and famous as the site of many Columbus Symphony Orchestra pop concerts. In 2009, the campus consisted of three buildings.

In 1907, William A. Noyes had enlarged the Review of American Chemical Research, an abstracting publication begun by Arthur Noyes in 1895 that was the forerunner of Chemical Abstracts. When it became evident that a separate publication containing these abstracts was needed, Noyes became the first editor of the new publication, Chemical Abstracts.

E. J. Crane became the first Director of Chemical Abstracts Service when it became an American Chemical Society division in 1956. Crane had been CA editor since 1915, and his dedication was a key factor in its long-term success.

Dale B. Baker became the CAS Director upon Crane's retirement in 1958. According to CAS, his visionary view of CAS' potential "led to expansion, modernization, and the forging of international alliances with other information organizations." CAS was an early leader in the use of computer technology to organize and disseminate information.

The CAS Chemical Registry System was introduced in 1965. CAS developed a unique registry number to identify chemical substances. Agencies such as the U.S. Environmental Protection Agency and local fire departments around the world now rely on these numbers for the definite identification of substances. According to the ACS, this is the largest chemical substance database in the world.

In 1965, CAS left their offices at OSU for a new headquarters north of campus. Ground was broken in 1971 for an expansion to the building designed by architects Brubaker/Brandt to accommodate the review of 400,000 new research reports printed each year. The 5-story 142,000 square foot building opened in May 1973.

In 2007, the ACS designated its Chemical Abstracts Service subdivision an ACS National Historic Chemical Landmark in recognition of its significance as a comprehensive repository of research in chemistry and related sciences.

In 2021, CAS rebranded along with a change in logo. The organization updated their mission to be more focused on dynamic responsiveness due to ongoing changes within scientific industries and communities.

In 2022, CAS announced the release of almost half a million CAS registry numbers under an open license in their Common Chemistry project.

== See also ==
- Beilstein database
- Chemical database
- ChemInform
- ChemSpider
- SPRESI database
- FIZ Karlsruhe
- Google Scholar
- Inorganic Crystal Structure Database
- List of academic databases and search engines
- List of chemical databases
- List of open-access journals
- List of scientific journals
- PubChem
