= Registry of Toxic Effects of Chemical Substances =

Database of toxicity information

Registry of Toxic Effects of Chemical Substances (RTECS) is a database of toxicity information compiled from the open scientific literature without reference to the validity or usefulness of the studies reported. Until 2001 it was maintained by US National Institute for Occupational Safety and Health (NIOSH) as a freely available publication. It is now maintained by the private company BIOVIA.

== Contents ==
Six types of toxicity data are included in the file:

1. Primary irritation
2. Mutagenic effects
3. Reproductive effects
4. Tumorigenic effects
5. Acute toxicity
6. Other multiple dose toxicity

Specific numeric toxicity values such as LD_{50}, LC_{50}, TDLo, and TCLo are noted as well as species studied and the route of administration used. For all data the bibliographic source is listed. The studies are not evaluated in any way.

== History ==
RTECS was an activity mandated by the US Congress, established by Section 20(a)(6) of the Occupational Safety and Health Act of 1970 (PL 91-596). The original edition, known as the Toxic Substances List was published on June 28, 1971, and included toxicological data for approximately 5,000 chemicals. The name changed later to its current name Registry of Toxic Effects of Chemical Substances. In 2000, NIOSH solicited proposals to transfer the RTECS trademark and database to a private company, and in December 2001 RTECS was transferred from NIOSH to the private company MDL, a subsidiary of Elsevier. Through a series of acquisitions and mergers, Dassault Systèmes acquired the database and, as of 2025, licenses RTECS through its BIOVIA brand.

RTECS is also available through 3rd party distributors like the Canadian Centre for Occupational Health and safety which sells licenses for English and French versions of RTECS.
