= Colocalization =

In fluorescence microscopy, colocalization refers to observation of the spatial overlap between two (or more) different fluorescent labels, each having a separate emission wavelength, to see if the different "targets" are located in the same area of the cell or very near to one another. The definition can be split into two different phenomena, co-occurrence, which refers to the presence of two (possibly unrelated) fluorophores in the same pixel, and correlation, a much more significant statistical relationship between the fluorophores indicative of a biological interaction. This technique is important to many cell biological and physiological studies during the demonstration of a relationship between pairs of bio-molecules.

== History ==
The ability to demonstrate a correlation between a pair of bio-molecules was greatly enhanced by Erik Manders of the University of Amsterdam who introduced Pearson's correlation coefficient (PCC) to microscopists, along with other coefficients of which the "overlap coefficients" M1 and M2 have proved to be the most popular and useful. The purpose of using coefficients is to characterize the degree of overlap between images, usually two channels in a multidimensional microscopy image recorded at different emission wavelengths. A popular approach was introduced by Sylvain Costes, who utilized Pearson's correlation coefficient as a tool for setting the thresholds required by M1 and M2 in an objective fashion. Costes approach makes the assumption that only positive correlations are of interest, and does not provide a useful measurement of PCC.

Although the use of coefficients can significantly improve the reliability of colocalization detection, it depends on the number of factors, including the conditions of how samples with fluorescence were prepared and how images with colocalization were acquired and processed. Studies should be conducted with great caution, and after careful background reading. Currently the field is dogged by confusion and a standardized approach is yet to be firmly established. Attempts to rectify this include re-examination and revision of some of the coefficients, application of a factor to correct for noise, "Replicate based noise corrected correlations for accurate measurements of colocalization". and the proposal of further protocols, which were thoroughly reviewed by Bolte and Cordelieres (2006). In addition, due to the tendency of fluorescence images to contain a certain amount of out-of-focus signal, and poisson shot and other noise, they usually require pre-processing prior to quantification. Careful image restoration by deconvolution removes noise and increases contrast in images, improving the quality of colocalization analysis results. Up to now, most frequently used methods to quantify colocalization calculate the statistical correlation of pixel intensities in two distinct microscopy channels. More recent studies have shown that this can lead to high correlation coefficients even for targets that are known to reside in different cellular compartments. A more robust quantification of colocalization can be achieved by combining digital object recognition, the calculation of the area overlap and combination with a pixel-intensity correlation value. This led to the concept of an object-corrected Pearson's correlation coefficient.

== Examples of use ==
Some impermeable fluorescent zinc dyes can detectably label the cytosol and nuclei of apoptizing and necrotizing cells among each of four different tissue types examined. Namely: the cerebral cortex, the hippocampus, the cerebellum, and it was also demonstrated that colocalized detection of zinc increase and the well accepted cell death indicator propidium iodide also occurred in kidney cells. Using the principles of fluorescent colocalization. coincident detection of zinc accumulation and propidium iodide (a traditional cell death indicator) uptake in multiple cell types was demonstrated. Various examples of quantification of colocalization in the field of neuroscience can be found in a review. Detailed protocols on the quantification of colocalization can be found in a book chapter.

== Single-molecule resolution ==
Colocalization is used in real-time single-molecule fluorescence microscopy to detect interactions between fluorescently labeled molecular species. In this case, one species (e.g. a DNA molecule) is typically immobilized on the imaging surface, and the other species (e.g. a DNA-binding protein) is supplied to the solution. The two species are labeled with dyes of spectrally resolved (>50 nm) colors, e.g. cyanine-3 and cyanine-5. Fluorescence excitation is typically carried out in total internal reflection mode which increases the signal-to-noise ratio for the molecules at the surface with respect to the molecules in bulk solution. The molecules are detected as spots appearing on the surface in real-time, and their locations are found to within 10-20 nm by fitting of point-spread functions. Since typical sizes of biomolecules are on the order of 10 nm, this precision is usually sufficient for calling of molecular interactions

== Interpretation of results ==
For the purpose of better interpretation of the results of qualitative and quantitative colocalization studies, it was suggested to use a set of five linguistic variables tied to the values of colocalization coefficients, such as very weak, weak, moderate, strong, and very strong, for describing them. The approach is based on the use of the fuzzy system model and computer simulation. When new coefficients are introduced, their values can be fitted into the set.

== Related techniques ==
- Förster resonance energy transfer (FRET): 10 nm proximity
  - (Light microscopy: only 250 nm resolution; no certainty of effective interaction)
- Immuno precipitation (IP) dropdowns / pulldowns
- Yeast 2 hybrid - protein interaction mapping

== Benchmark images ==
The degree of colocalization in fluorescence microscopy images can be validated using the Colocalization Benchmark Source, a free collection of downloadable image sets with pre-defined values of colocalization.

== Software implementations ==
=== open source ===
- FIJI is just ImageJ - batteries included
- BioImage XD

=== closed source ===
- AxioVision Colocalization Module
- Colocalization Research Software
- CoLocalizer Pro CoLocalizer Pro
- Nikon's NIS-Elements Colocalization Module
- Scientific Volume Imaging's Huygens Colocalization Analyzer
- Quorum Technology's Volocity
- Media Cybernetics's Image-Pro
- Bitplane's Imaris
- arivis Vision4D
