= Structure atlas of human genome =

SAHG

Content
- Description: predicted structures of all human proteins.
- Organisms: Homo sapiens

Contact
- Research center: National Institute of Advanced Industrial Science and Technology, Tokyo
- Laboratory: Computational Biology Research Center
- Authors: Chie Motono
- Primary citation: Motono & al. (2011)
- Release date: 2010

Access
- Website: http://bird.cbrc.jp/sahg

The Structure atlas of human genome (SAHG) is a database of protein-structure-prediction.

== See also ==
- Protein structure
