= Phospho.ELM =

Content
- Description: phosphorylation sites

Contact
- Research center: EMBL Heidelberg
- Laboratory: SCB Unit
- Authors: Holger Dinkel
- Primary citation: Dinkel & al. (2011)

Access
- Website: http://phospho.elm.eu.org

Phospho.ELM is a database storing the phosphorylation data extracted from the literature and the analyses.
