= Canadian Centre for Occupational Health and Safety =

Canadian government agency

Agency overview
- Formed: 1978
- Headquarters: 135 Hunter Street East; Hamilton, Ontario; 43.2526°N 79.8653°W
- Minister responsible: Patty Hajdu, Minister of Jobs and Families
- Website: www.ccohs.ca

The Canadian Centre for Occupational Health and Safety (CCOHS, French: Centre canadien d'hygiène et de sécurité au travail, CCHST) is an independent departmental corporation under Schedule II of the Financial Administration Act and is accountable to Parliament through the Minister of Jobs and Families.

CCOHS is the primary national agency in Canada for the advancement of safe and healthy workplaces and preventing work-related injuries, illnesses and deaths. Additional work in this area is carried out by provincial and territorial labour departments and workers' compensation.

CCOHS was created in 1978 by an Act of Parliament – Canadian Centre for Occupational Health and Safety Act S.C., 1977–78, c. 29. The act was based on the belief that all Canadians had "...a fundamental right to a healthy and safe working environment".

The centre, located in Hamilton, Ontario, is governed by a tripartite Council of Governors representing government (federal, provincial and territorial), employers, and workers.

CCOHS promotes the total well-being—physical, psychosocial and mental health—of working Canadians by providing information, training, education, management systems and solutions. It makes credible information about workplace hazards and conditions easily and widely accessible to all Canadians - promoting safe and healthy workplaces.

== Services ==
- Partial online list (with hyperlinks) of occupational safety regulations in Canada and its provinces
- Safety InfoLine Service - the free, confidential, person-to-person information service for Canadians
- OSH Answers - Q&A on CCOHS website
- Health and Safety Report - free monthly electronic newsletter
- Flu and Infectious Disease Outbreak Planning portal - tools, tips and resources
- Advancing Healthy Workplaces portal - information on creating healthy workplaces
- Webinar presentations
- Podcasts on a variety of issues and topics as well as interviews with experts
- Workplace Hazardous Materials Information System (WHMIS) Classification Database
- Young Workers Zone website for new and young workers, addressing the high levels of injuries and illnesses suffered by this group of workers
- CANOSH website – a web portal of links to Canadian occupational health and safety information that is provided by federal, provincial and territorial government agencies, Workers' Compensation Boards and the Canadian Centre for Occupational Health and Safety. The site aims to make this information readily and easily accessible to Canadians in the continuing effort to prevent workplace injury and illness and help create healthy workplaces. Canosh was created and is maintained by the Canadian Centre for Occupational Health and Safety.
- Podcasts - new episodes added monthly
- e-courses
- Registry of Toxic Effects of Chemical Substances (RTECS)
- Chemical safety databases and services
- MSDS Management Service
- OSH Works Occupational Health and Safety Management Service
- F 500 Encapsulator Agent, approved by CEPA for firefighting
- Health and safety promotional tools
- Health and safety pocket guides - CCOHS publications are offered in English and French and in several formats (print, CD ROM, DVD, PDF)
- CANWrite Safety Data Sheets authoring software

== See also ==
- Occupational Safety and Health Administration (OSHA), the equivalent agency in the United States
