= Beilstein Registry Number =

The Beilstein Registry Number is a way of identifying compounds similar to the CAS registry number. It is the unique identifier for compounds in the Beilstein database.
