= SciTegic =

American technology company

- Industry: software
- Founded: February 1999
- Founder: Mathew A. Hahn; David Rogers
- Headquarters: San Diego
- Subsidiaries: Accelrys

SciTegic was a San Diego–based software company that developed and marketed informatics software to the pharmaceutical and biotechnology industries.

== History ==
The company was founded in February 1999 by Mathew A. Hahn and David Rogers. Mathew Hahn and David Rogers came from the bioinformatics software company Molecular Simulations.

In 2004, it became a wholly owned subsidiary of Accelrys after a $21.5 million deal.

== Pipeline pilot ==
Pipeline pilot was designed to reduce the manual data entry and transfer steps required of computational chemists and project chemists in screening and modeling workflows. A streamlined workflow could then be used by bench scientists and reduce the need to interact with multiple software packages to one interface.

Creating Pipeline Pilot, SciTegic has pioneered a technology approach called "Data Pipelining" to flexibly process drug discovery data. This software uses a visual and dataflow programming language much like LabVIEW for piping input and output of commands together to build a pipeline to transform any number of inputs (raw data) into any number of outputs (e.g., a spreadsheet tying together the results of multiple experiments).

Mathew Hahn assumed technical leadership roles, including Chief Technology Officer, for Accelrys after the acquisition.

== See also ==
- Accelrys
- Kensington Discovery Edition (KDE) from Inforsense Ltd
- Taverna workbench
- TFP Lab Tech. White Carbon
