= ZINC database =

Database of chemical compounds

Content
- Description: Chemical database
- Data types captured: Commercially available and annotated small molecules for virtual screening

Contact
- Research center: University of California San Francisco
- Laboratory: Irwin Lab; Shoichet Lab
- Authors: John Irwin, Brian Shoichet, and a cast of several
- Primary citation: PMID 26479676
- Release date: 2004

Access
- Website: ZINC

Miscellaneous
- License: ZINC is free to use for everyone. Redistribution of significant subsets requires written permission from the authors.
- Versioning: ZINC-22
- Data release frequency: continuously updated; static subsets regenerated quarterly or better.
- Curation policy: continuously curated

The ZINC database (recursive acronym: ZINC is not commercial) is a curated collection of commercially available chemical compounds prepared especially for virtual screening. ZINC is used by investigators (generally people with training as biologists or chemists) in pharmaceutical companies, biotechnology companies, and research universities.

== Scope and access ==
ZINC is different from other chemical databases because it aims to represent the biologically relevant, three dimensional form of the molecule.

== Curation and updates ==
ZINC is updated regularly and may be downloaded and used free of charge. It is developed by John Irwin in the Shoichet Laboratory in the Department of Pharmaceutical Chemistry at the University of California, San Francisco.

== Version ==
The latest release of the website interface is "ZINC-22". The database is continuously updated and as of 2023 is claimed to contain over 37 billion commercially available molecules.

== Uses ==
The database is typically used for molecule mining, a process in which Quantitative structure–activity relationships are used to find new compounds with improved biological activity, given a known starting point found, for example, by high-throughput screening.

== See also ==
- PubChem a database of small molecules from the chemical and biological literature, hosted by NCBI
- ChEMBL, a database of information about medicinal chemistry and biological activities of small molecules.
- Ultra-large-scale docking
