= LOLI Database =

The LOLI Database, an abbreviation of List Of LIsts, is an international chemical regulatory database developed and maintained by ChemADVISOR, Inc.

The LOLI database is one of the primary sources of information for the creation of safety data sheets and other hazard communication documents. The database "lets users check individual or groups of chemical substances against any or all of the regulations noted within the database" in order to identify the regulations that apply to those substances. The LOLI database can be accessed using either LOLI Desktop, LOLI in the Cloud or LOLI-On-Line. ChemADVISOR Navigator provides regulatory context.

The database was first created in 1986. Since then, the database has grown to include over 5800 separate lists from 128 countries.

== See also ==
- Chemical database
