= Moiety (chemistry) =

Relatively large characteristic segment of a molecule

Benzyl acetate contains a benzyloxy moiety (encircled with light orange). It also contains an ester functional group (in red), and an acetyl functional group (encircled with dark green). Other divisions can be made.

In organic chemistry, a moiety (/ˈmɔɪəti/ MOY-ə-tee) is a part of a molecule that is given a name because it is identified as a part of other molecules as well.

Typically, the term is used to describe the larger and characteristic parts of organic molecules, and it should not be used to describe or name smaller functional groups of atoms that chemically react in similar ways in most molecules that contain them. Occasionally, a moiety may contain smaller moieties and functional groups.

A moiety that acts as a branch extending from the backbone of a hydrocarbon molecule is called a substituent or side chain, which typically can be removed from the molecule and substituted with others.

== Active moiety ==
In pharmacology, an active moiety is the part of a molecule or ion—excluding appended inactive portions—that is responsible for the physiological or pharmacological action of a drug substance. Inactive appended portions of the drug substance may include either the alcohol or acid moiety of an ester, a salt (including a salt with hydrogen or coordination bonds), or other noncovalent derivative (such as a complex, chelate, or clathrate). The parent drug may itself be an inactive prodrug and only after the active moiety is released from the parent in free form does it become active.

== See also ==
- Moiety conservation
- The dictionary definition of moiety at Wiktionary
