= Beilstein database =

Database in the field of organic chemistry

The Beilstein database is a database in the field of organic chemistry, in which compounds are uniquely identified by their Beilstein Registry Number. The database covers the scientific literature from 1771 to the present and contains experimentally validated information on millions of chemical reactions and substances from original scientific publications. The electronic database was created from Handbuch der Organischen Chemie (Beilstein's Handbook of Organic Chemistry), founded by Friedrich Konrad Beilstein in 1881, but has appeared online under a number of different names, including Crossfire Beilstein. Since 2009, the content has been maintained and distributed by Elsevier Information Systems in Frankfurt under the product name "Reaxys".

The database contains information on reactions, substances, structures and properties. Up to 350 fields containing chemical and physical data (such as melting point, refractive index etc.) are available for each substance. References to the literature in which the reaction or substance data appear are also given.

The Beilstein content made available through Reaxys is complemented by information drawn from Gmelin (which gives access to the Gmelin Database), a very large repository of organometallic and inorganic information, as well as by information drawn from the Patent Chemistry Database. The Reaxys registered trademark and the database itself are owned and protected by Elsevier Properties SA and used under license.

== History ==
Beilstein was founded as German-language standard reference work for organic chemistry was intended to supplement the content of the Chemisches Zentralblatt. In light of the leading role of German chemistry in international science, Beilstein's handbook quickly became renowned as a standard reference throughout the world. The first edition of his "Handbuch der organischen Chemie" appeared in two volumes in 1881 and 1883, referencing 15,000 compounds in about 2,200 pages. The second edition appeared in three volumes from 1885 to 1889 and 4,080 pages, and from 1892 to 1899 came the third edition in 4 volumes and 6,844 pages. In 1896, the continuation of the handbook was placed in the care of the German Chemical Society, which first published the supplementary volumes of the 3rd edition and, from 1918, the fourth edition. Starting with the 5th supplement, following the superseding of German by English as most relevant scientific language, the handbook appeared in English.

== See also ==
- Dortmund Data Bank
- List of academic databases and search engines
