= Colocalization Benchmark Source =

The Colocalization Benchmark Source

Content
- Description: A free source of benchmark images to validate colocalization in fluorescence microscopy studies

Contact
- Authors: Vadym Zinchuk, Yong Wu, Olga Grossenbacher-Zinchuk
- Release date: 2012

Access
- Data format: Lossless Tagged Image File Format (TIFF)
- Website: colocalization-benchmark.com

Miscellaneous
- License: Free
- Version: 2.0

The Colocalization Benchmark Source (CBS) is a free collection of downloadable images for testing and validating the degree of colocalization of markers in any fluorescence microscopy study. Colocalization is a visual phenomenon in which two molecules of interest are associated with the same structures in the cells and may share common functional characteristics.

CBS provides researchers with reference tools to verify the results of quantitative colocalization measurements. It serves as a specialised bioimage informatics database of computer-simulated images with precisely known (pre-defined) values of colocalization. These images were created using an image simulation algorithm. These benchmark images can be downloaded either as complete sets or individually. By calculating and comparing the values of coefficients in their own images with those in the benchmark images, researchers can validate the results of quantitative colocalization studies. The use of CBS images has been described in a number of studies.

== Examples ==
Researchers can submit examples of custom images in which the benchmark images were used to validate colocalization. Submitted images are posted on the website of CBS along with descriptions of their properties and the values of coefficients, such as Pearson's correlation coefficient (Rr), overlap coefficient (R), and others. A template for submitting information about custom images can be downloaded from the CBS site.

== See also ==
- Colocalization
- Fluorescence microscopy
- Bioimage informatics
- Biological database
