= Minas (band) =

Minas is a Philadelphia-based bossa nova jazz band consisting of singer and guitarist Orlando Haddad and singer and pianist Patricia King.

Haddad is noted for bringing Brazilian music and culture to the city of Philadelphia, PA when he and his wife Patricia, after living in Brazil, moved back from Rio de Janeiro to the U.S. in 1984. Minas has performed in all of the area's main venues and Orlando taught Brazilian Percussion at the University of the Arts, a post he held for 10 years. Minas also created an educational program, “Brazilian Adventure”, which brought assembly programs and residencies to public and independent schools in the tri-state area. This program has been seen by over 500,000 students.

Minas also created PhilaSamba, a samba school in Philadelphia, in 1987, with the help of the city's Latin American Musicians Association and musician Eugene Rausa.

In 2015, their sixth studio album Symphony in Bossa was nominated for four Grammys, including for Best Latin Jazz album of the year.

== Members ==
Orlando Haddad (born Orlando Haddad Filho on April 19, 1953, in Lavras, Minas Gerais) is the son of a physician and a piano teacher of Lebanese descent. He began playing piano at age six and as a child growing up in Brazil he studied classical piano and guitar. In his hometown of Lavras, Haddad was the leader of the pop-rock band Os Miseráveis (later renamed Electron 6). The group disbanded and with three other high school friends, he formed the group Zin performing mostly British/American as well as popular Brazilian music. Haddad later moved to Rio de Janeiro, where he studied at the Villa-Lôbos Institute and pursued private classical guitar studies. At the height of the military dictatorship, music schools were not well funded in Brazil, so Haddad transferred to the University of North Carolina School of the Arts, where he received his bachelor's degree in composition in 1979. He later received a Masters of Science in Arts Administration from Drexel University in 1986, and in 2002 a Masters in Composition from Temple University, in Philadelphia.

Patricia King Haddad (born Patricia Gale King on April 27, 1956, in Denver, Colorado) grew up in Carlisle, Pennsylvania, where she began her music education studying voice and piano, performed in musicals and theatrical productions at age six. In 1974 she enrolled at University of North Carolina School of the Arts (UNCSA) where she studied opera and continued piano studies and composition. She holds a master's degree in Jazz Piano Performance from Philadelphia's University of the Arts and a degree in classical voice from UNCSA. In addition to performing, composing and recording works with Minas, King wrote the story, music, and lyrics for her operetta La Giara (The Water Jug) a story about her families emigration from Sicily to Philadelphia.

== History ==
In 1975, Haddad and King met while attending the University of North Carolina School of the Arts in Winston-Salem, NC and first began performing as the duo "Orlando & Patricia" on campus as well as local bars and small concert halls.

In 1978, trip to Brazil, Haddad and King met Coquinho, Carlos Roberto Teixeira Alves, the drummer of Os Miseráveis, and Electron 6, bands Orlando played in during his high school years. Alves moved to the US and joined King & Haddad to form a trio which they named Minas, after Haddad and Alves’ home state of Minas Gerais. Soon the trio became a quartet with the addition of bassist Rick Heyman, who was from Paramus, NJ. Minas went on for a couple of years performing until Alves left the group and was replaced by Brazilian Manoel Monteiro, originally from São Paulo. The group worked extensively in the southern states of North and South Carolina, Virginia, Tennessee, and up north in Pennsylvania, until both Rick and Manoel left the group for unknown reasons. Haddad and King continued performing under the name Minas as a duo from then til present time.

Haddad and King were married in October 1979 in Lexington, VA. The ceremony was officiated by a long time friend, Rev. Langston Randolph Harrison, a teacher and missionary at Lavras' Instituto Gammon. Now as husband and wife the couple continued performing in North Carolina until 1981. After the birth of their daughter Nicole, they decided to move to Brazil, where they lived near Haddad's family and continued to perform in Minas Gerais, Rio de Janeiro, and Pernambuco at clubs, festivals and universities. Joining a recent movement of independent recording artist and labels started by pianist, bandleader and composer Antonio Adolfo, they released their first vinyl “Num Dia Azul” in 1983, which was part of the first catalog of independent record producers in Rio de Janeiro.

After living in Brazil for some time, Haddad and King returned to the United States and settled in the city of Philadelphia where they now live with their two children, daughter Nicole Michele Haddad and son Jordan Alexander King Haddad.

Through their musical writings and arrangements as MINAS and its various projects, many jazz musicians in the U.S. and Brazil have collaborated with Haddad and King (MINAS) on recordings and/ or live performances to include: Paul Winter, Herbie Mann, Gerald Veasley, Cyro Baptista, Hendrik Meurkens, Rob Hyman, Djalma Corrêa, John Swana, Rogerio Boccato, David Finke, Adriano Santos, Adriano Giffoni, João Cortez, Vanderlei Pereira, Cid Teixeira, Andrew Neu, Larry McKenna.

== Discography ==
- 1983 - Num Dia Azul (as Patricia & Orlando)
- 1986 - Dreams of Brazil
- 1996 - Blue Azul
- 2006 - In Rio
- 2009 - Bossa Nova Day
- 2014 - "Girl from Ipanema" - anniversary tribute single
- 2015 - Symphony in Bossa
