= PHOSIDA =

Content
- Description: posttranslational modification database.

Contact
- Research center: Max-Planck-Institute for Biochemistry
- Laboratory: Department of Proteomics and Signal Transduction
- Authors: Florian Gnad
- Primary citation: Gnad & al. (2011)
- Release date: 2009

Access
- Website: http://www.phosida.com

The PHOsphorylation SIte DAtabase PHOSIDA integrates thousands of high-confidence in vivo phosphosites identified in various species on the basis of mass spectrometry technology. For each phosphosite, PHOSIDA lists matching kinase motifs, predicted secondary structures, conservation patterns, and its dynamic regulation upon stimulus or other treatments such as kinase inhibition, for example. It includes phosphoproteomes of various organisms ranging from eukaryotes such as human and yeast to bacteria such as Escherichia coli and Lactococcus lactis. Even the phosphoproteome of an archaean organism, namely Halobacterium salinarium, is available. The integration of phosphoproteomes identified in organisms, which cover the phylogenetic tree representatively, enables to examine phosphorylation events from a global point of view including conservation and evolutionary preservation in time.

Moreover, PHOSIDA also predicts phosphosites on the basis of support vector machines.
