= Phosphorylation =

Chemical process of introducing a phosphate

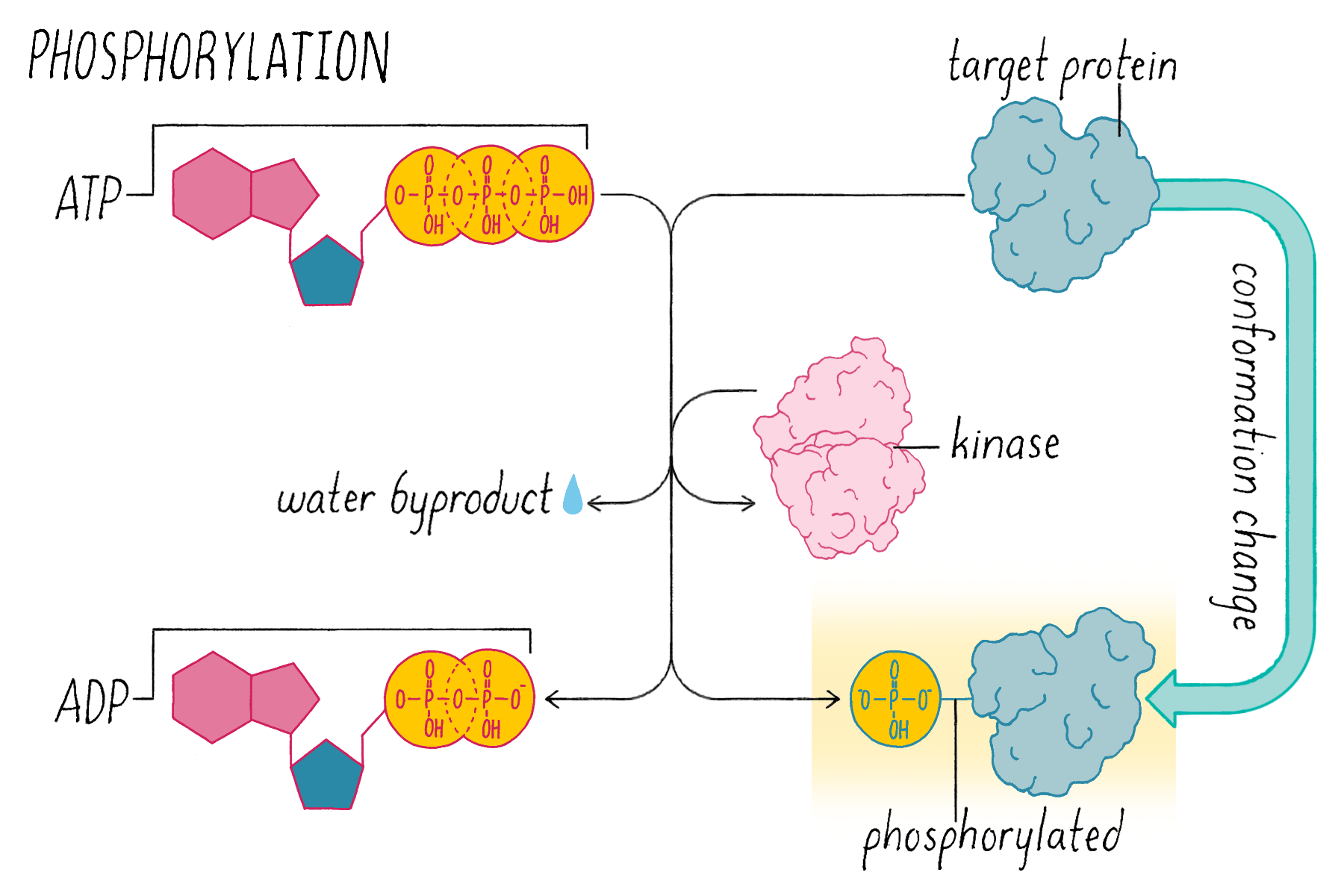
The addition of a phosphate group to an amino acid (serine, threonine, tyrosine, or histidine) on a protein.

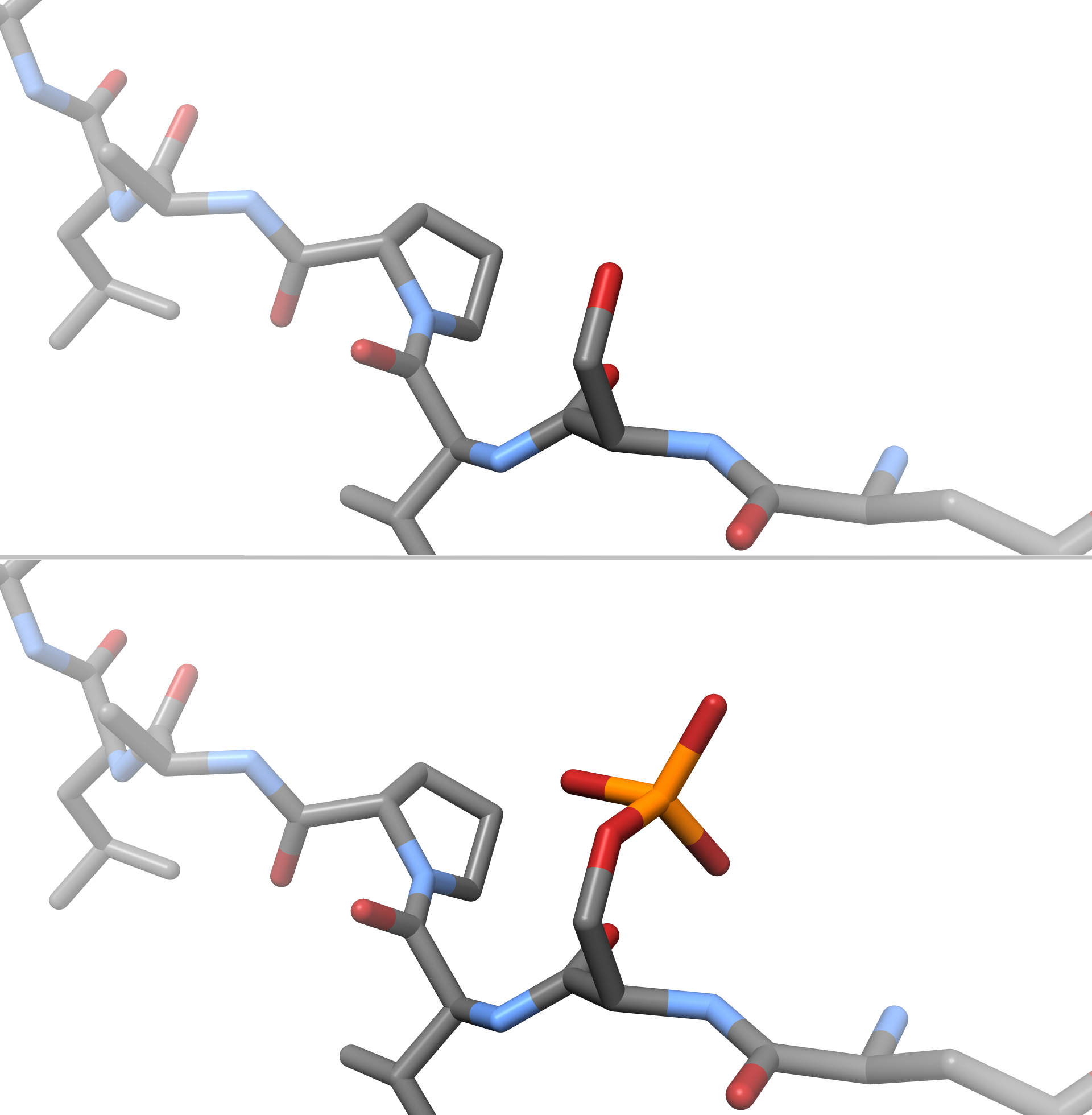
Serine in an amino acid chain, before and after phosphorylation.

In biochemistry, phosphorylation is described as the "transfer of a phosphate group" from a donor to an acceptor or the addition of a phosphate group to a molecule. A common phosphorylating agent (phosphate donor) is ATP and a common family of acceptor are alcohols:

[Adenosyl−O−PO_{2}−O−PO_{2}−O−PO_{3}]^{4−} + ROH → [Adenosyl−O−PO_{2}−O−PO_{3}H]^{2−} + [RO−P−O_{3}]^{2−}

This equation can be written in several ways that are nearly equivalent that describe the behaviors of various protonated states of ATP, ADP, and the phosphorylated product. As is clear from the equation, a phosphate group per se is not transferred, but a phosphoryl group (PO_{3}^{-}). Phosphoryl is an electrophile. This process and its inverse, dephosphorylation, are common in biology. Protein phosphorylation often activates (or deactivates) many enzymes.

== ATP is produced by phosphorylation ==
Although most often discussed in terms of the consumption of ATP (GTP and others), phosphorylation must also be involved in the production of these energy-rich species. ATP is produced by:

- oxidative phosphorylation during aerobic respiration in the mitochondrion from adenosine diphosphate (ADP).
- substrate-level phosphorylation during glycolysis and the Krebs cycle.
- By photophosphorylation in the chloroplasts of plant cells.

== Phosphorylation of glucose ==
=== Glucose metabolism ===
Phosphorylation of sugars is often the first stage in their catabolism. Phosphorylation allows cells to accumulate sugars because the phosphate group prevents the molecules from diffusing back across their transporter. Phosphorylation of glucose is a key reaction in sugar metabolism. The chemical equation for the conversion of D-glucose to D-glucose-6-phosphate in the first step of glycolysis is given by:

D-glucose + ATP → D-glucose 6-phosphate + ADP

ΔG° = −16.7 kJ/mol (° indicates measurement at standard condition)

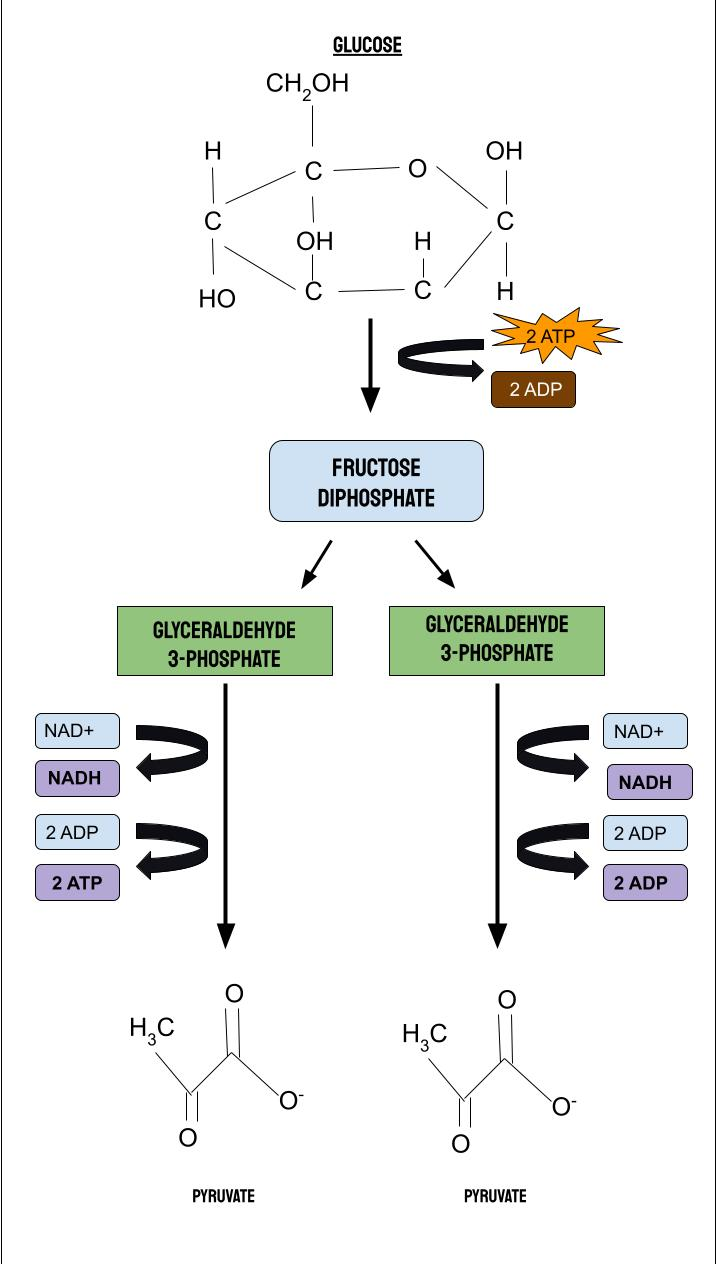
Glycolysis is a process that breaks down glucose into 2 pyruvate molecules, using ATP and NADH as well as producing it.

Glucose is converted to glucose-6-phosphate catalyzed by the enzyme hexokinase. Fructose-6-phosphate is converted to fructose 1,6-bisphosphate. This reaction is catalyzed by phosphofructokinase.

Glyceraldehyde 3-phosphate is again phosphorylated to give 1,3-bisphosphoglycerate. This reaction is catalyzed by glyceraldehyde-3-phosphate dehydrogenase (GAPDH).

=== Glycogen synthesis ===
The phosphorylation of glucose to glucose 6-phosphate has role in regulating glycogen synthase.

Glucose is phosphorylated to glucose 6-phosphate to allow its transport across the membrane by ATP-D-glucose 6-phosphotransferase and non-specific hexokinase (ATP-D-hexose 6-phosphotransferase). Liver cells are freely permeable to glucose, and the initial rate of phosphorylation of glucose is the rate-limiting step in glucose metabolism by the liver.

The liver's crucial role in controlling blood sugar concentrations by breaking down glucose into carbon dioxide and glycogen is characterized by the negative Gibbs free energy (ΔG) value, which indicates that this is a point of regulation with. The hexokinase enzyme has a low Michaelis constant (K_{m}), indicating a high affinity for glucose, so this initial phosphorylation can proceed even when glucose levels at nanoscopic scale within the blood.

The phosphorylation of glucose can be enhanced by the binding of fructose 6-phosphate (F6P), and lessened by the binding fructose 1-phosphate (F1P). Fructose consumed in the diet is converted to F1P in the liver. This negates the action of F6P on glucokinase, which ultimately favors the forward reaction. The capacity of liver cells to phosphorylate fructose exceeds capacity to metabolize fructose-1-phosphate. Consuming excess fructose ultimately results in an imbalance in liver metabolism, which indirectly exhausts the liver cell's supply of ATP.

Allosteric activation by glucose-6-phosphate, which acts as an effector, stimulates glycogen synthase, and glucose-6-phosphate may inhibit the phosphorylation of glycogen synthase by cyclic AMP-stimulated protein kinase.

=== Other processes ===
Phosphorylation of glucose is imperative in processes within the body. For example, phosphorylating glucose is necessary for insulin-dependent mechanistic target of rapamycin pathway activity within the heart. This further suggests a link between intermediary metabolism and cardiac growth.

== Protein phosphorylation ==
Protein phosphorylation is the most common post-translational modification in eukaryotes. The most common phospho-amino acid residues are those serine, threonine, and tyrosine at a ratio of 1800:200:1. Phosphorylation of the side chains of these residues through phosphoester bond formation, on histidine, lysine and arginine through phosphoramidate bonds, and on aspartic acid and glutamic acid through mixed anhydride linkages.

Protein phosphorylation is common on human non-canonical amino acids, including motifs containing phosphorylated histidine, aspartate, glutamate, cysteine, arginine and lysine in HeLa cell extracts. Histidine phosphorylates at both the 1 and 3 N-atoms of the imidazole ring. Phospho-tyrosine is much more stable than phospho-serine and -threonine which are in turn more stable than other phospho-amino acids, hence the analysis of phosphorylated histidine (and other non-canonical amino acids) using standard biochemical and mass spectrometric approaches is much more challenging and special procedures and separation techniques are required for their preservation alongside classical Ser, Thr and Tyr phosphorylation.

The prominent role of protein phosphorylation in biochemistry is illustrated by the many publication on the subject (as of March 2015, the MEDLINE database returns over 240,000 articles, mostly on protein phosphorylation).

== See also ==
- Moiety conservation
- Phosida
- Phosphoamino acid analysis
- Phospho3D
