= Japanese Existing and New Chemical Substances =

Chemical database

Japanese Existing and New Chemical Substances (ENCS) is an inventory database for the management of existing and new chemicals primarily aimed at manufacturers of chemicals within, and importers of chemicals to Japan.
