= Lowest published toxic dose =

Lowest dosage known to be toxic

In toxicology, the lowest published toxic dose (Toxic Dose Low, TD_{Lo}) is the lowest dosage per unit of bodyweight (typically stated in milligrams per kilogram) of a substance known to have produced signs of toxicity in a particular animal species. When quoting a TD_{Lo}, the particular species and method of administration (e.g. ingested, inhaled, intravenous) are typically stated.

The TD_{Lo} is different from the LD_{50} (lethal dose) which is the dose causing death in 50% of people who are exposed or who consume the substance.

== See also ==
- Certain safety factor
- Lowest published lethal dose (LD_{Lo})
- Median lethal dose (LD_{50})
