= Moiety conservation =

Concept in biochemistry

Moiety conservation is the conservation of a subgroup in a chemical species, which is cyclically transferred from one molecule to another. In biochemistry, moiety conservation can have profound effects on the system's dynamics.

== Moiety-conserved cycles in biochemistry ==
A typical example of a conserved moiety in biochemistry is the Adenosine diphosphate (ADP) subgroup that remains unchanged when it is phosphorylated to create adenosine triphosphate (ATP) and then dephosphorylated back to ADP forming a conserved cycle. Moiety-conserved cycles in nature exhibit unique network control features which can be elucidated using techniques such as metabolic control analysis. Other examples in metabolism include NAD/NADH, NADP/NADPH, CoA/Acetyl-CoA. Conserved cycles also exist in large numbers in protein signaling networks when proteins get phosphorylated and dephosphorylated.

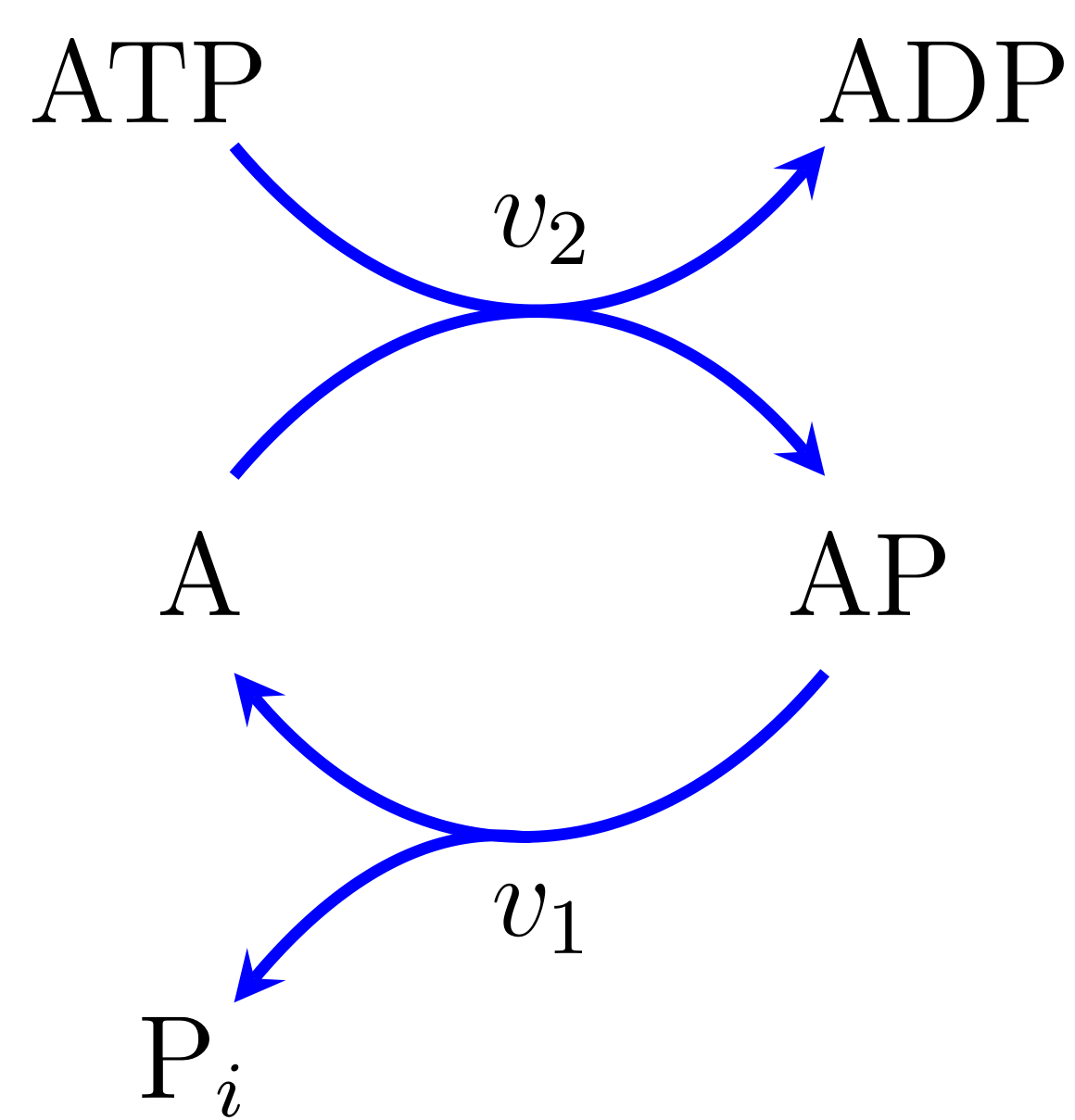
Phosphorylation Cycle. Moiety A is conserved.

Most, if not all, of these cycles, are time-scale-dependent. For example, although a protein in a phosphorylation cycle is conserved during the interconversion, over a longer time scale, there will be low levels of protein synthesis and degradation, which change the level of protein moiety. The same applies to cycles involving ATP, NAD, etc. Thus, although the concept of a moiety-conserved cycle in biochemistry is a useful approximation, over time scales that include significant net synthesis and degradation of the moiety, the approximation is no longer valid. When invoking the conserved-moiety assumption on a particular moiety, we are, in effect, assuming the system is closed to that moiety.

== Identifying conserved cycles ==
Conserved cycles in a biochemical network can be identified by examination of the stoichiometry matrix, $\boldsymbol{N}$. The stoichiometry matrix for a simple cycle with species A and AP is given by:

$$\boldsymbol{N}=\begin{bmatrix}
1 & -1 \\
-1 & 1
\end{bmatrix}$$

The rates of change of A and AP can be written using the equation:

$$\begin{bmatrix}
\frac{dA}{dt} \\
\frac{dAP}{dt}
\end{bmatrix}=
\left[\begin{array}{rr}
1 & -1 \\
-1 & 1
\end{array}\right]
\left[\begin{array}{r}
v_1 \\
v_2
\end{array}\right]$$

Expanding the expression leads to:

$$\begin{align}
\frac{dA}{dt} &= v_1 - v_2 \\[4pt]
\frac{dAP}{dt} &= v_2 - v_1
\end{align}$$

Note that $dA/dt + dAP/dt = 0$. This means that $A + AP = T$, where $T$ is the total mass of moiety $A$.

Given an arbitrary system:

$\boldsymbol{N} \boldsymbol{v} = \frac{d\boldsymbol{x}}{dt}$

elementary row operations can be applied to both sides such that the stoichiometric matrix is reduced to its echelon form, $\boldsymbol{M}$ giving:

$$\begin{bmatrix}
\boldsymbol{M} \\
\boldsymbol{0}
\end{bmatrix} \boldsymbol{v} = \boldsymbol{E} \frac{d\boldsymbol{x}}{dt}$$

The elementary operations are captured in the $\boldsymbol{E}$ matrix. We can partition $\boldsymbol{E}$ to match the echelon matrix where the zero rows begin such that:

$$\begin{bmatrix}
\boldsymbol{M} \\
\boldsymbol{0}
\end{bmatrix} \boldsymbol{v} =
\begin{bmatrix}
\boldsymbol{X} \\
\boldsymbol{Y}
\end{bmatrix}
\frac{d\boldsymbol{x}}{dt}$$

By multiplying out the lower partition, we obtain:

$\boldsymbol{Y} \frac{d\boldsymbol{x}}{dt} = 0$

The $\boldsymbol{Y}$ matrix will contain entries corresponding to the conserved cycle participants.

== Conserved cycles and computer models ==
The presence of conserved moieties can affect how computer simulation models are constructed. Moiety-conserved cycles will reduce the number of differential equations required to solve a system. For example, a simple cycle has only one independent variable. The other variable can be computed using the difference between the total mass and the independent variable. The set of differential equations for the two-cycle is given by:

$$\begin{aligned}
\frac{d A}{d t} &=v_1-v_2 \\[4pt]
\frac{d AP}{d t}&=v_2-v_1
\end{aligned}$$

These can be reduced to one differential equation and one linear algebraic equation:

$$\begin{aligned}
AP &=T-A \\[4pt]
\frac{dA}{d t} &= v_1-v_2
\end{aligned}$$
