= Chemisches Zentralblatt =

- Language: German
- Edited by: Gustav Theodor Fechner (founder)

Publication details
- Former names: Pharmaceutisches Centralblatt, Chemisch-Pharmazeutisch Zentralblatt
- History: 1830–1969
- Publisher: Leopold Voß (Germany)

Standard abbreviations
- ISO 4: Chem. Zentralblatt

Indexing
- ISSN: 0577-6287

Chemisches Zentralblatt is the first and oldest abstracts journal published in the field of chemistry. It covers the chemical literature from 1830 to 1969 and describes therefore the "birth" of chemistry as science, in contrast to alchemy. The information contained in this German journal is comparable with the content of the leading source of chemical information Chemical Abstracts Service (CAS), which started publishing abstracts in English in 1907.

Chemisches Zentralblatt was founded as Pharmaceutisches Centralblatt by Gustav Theodor Fechner and published by Leopold Voß in Leipzig in 1830. In the first year, 544 pages containing 400 abstracts were published, reporting all relevant research results in pharmaceutical chemistry. In the following 20 years the relevance of chemistry grew so much that in 1850 the title changed in Chemisch-Pharmaceutisches Central-Blatt, and in 1856 it became Chemisches Zentralblatt. In 1969, after 140 years the expenses for the collection of primary literature in many languages and the production of abstracts were too high and the publication of Chemisches Zentralblatt ceased.

In these 140 years, scientific editors reported research progresses in chemistry with approximately 2 million abstracts, publishing over 650,000 pages. Additional 180,000 pages contain indexes such as index of authors, subject indexes, general indexes, register of patents, and formula register.

Chemisches Zentralblatt was completely digitized by FIZ Chemie in Berlin. FIZ Chemie scanned the entire work and developed a full text searchable database for the web. In addition the database can be purchased and integrated in Intranets. The chemical software company InfoChem, based in Munich, developed an Internet-based database, the Chemisches Zentralblatt Structural Database. This database provides access to the chemical content within the Chemisches Zentralblatt by performing chemical structure and substructure searches.

Since 2016, Chemisches Zentralblatt is available on the web via subscription as a part of SciFinder. These entries are labeled in SciFinder under codes CZ, CHZE, and CHEMZENT, and they may duplicate entries in other SciFinder sub-databases.
