= CAS Registry Number =

Chemical identifier

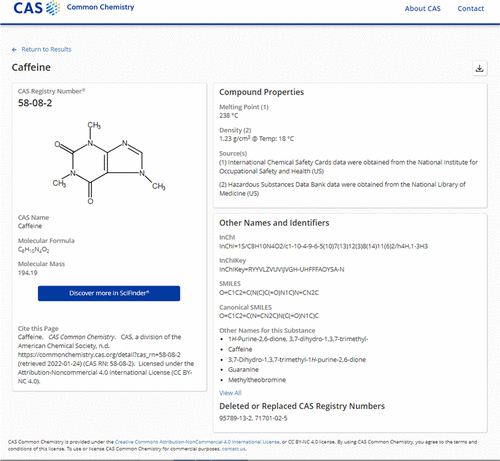
Screenshot of the CAS Common Chemistry database with information about caffeine (58-08-2)

A CAS Registry Number (also referred to as CAS RN or informally CAS Number) is a unique identification number, assigned by the Chemical Abstracts Service (CAS) in the US to every chemical substance described in the open scientific literature, in order to index the substance in the CAS Registry. This registry includes all substances described since 1957, plus some substances from as far back as the early 1800s. It is a chemical database that includes organic and inorganic compounds, minerals, isotopes, alloys, mixtures, and nonstructurable materials (UVCBs - substances of unknown or variable composition, complex reaction products, or biological origin). CAS RNs are generally serial numbers (with a check digit), so they do not contain any information about the structures themselves the way SMILES and InChI strings do.

The CAS Registry is an authoritative collection of disclosed chemical substance information. It identifies more than 204 million unique organic and inorganic substances and 69 million protein and DNA sequences, plus additional information about each substance. It is updated with around 15,000 additional new substances daily. The full registry is available on a paid subscription basis. A collection of almost 500 thousand CAS registry numbers is made available under a CC BY-NC license at ACS Commons Chemistry.

== History and use ==
Historically, chemicals have been identified by a wide variety of synonyms and properties. One of the biggest challenges in the early development of substance indexing, a task undertaken by the Chemical Abstracts Service, was in identifying if a substance in literature was new or if it had been previously discovered. Well-known chemicals may be known via multiple generic, historical, commercial, and/or (black)-market names, and even systematic nomenclature based on structure alone was not universally useful. An algorithm was developed to translate the structural formula of a chemical into a computer-searchable table, which provided a basis for the service that listed each chemical with its CAS Registry Number, the CAS Chemical Registry System, which became operational in 1965.

CAS Registry Numbers (CAS RN) are simple and regular, convenient for database searches. They offer a reliable, common and international link to every specific substance across the various nomenclatures and disciplines used by branches of science, industry, and regulatory bodies. Almost all molecule databases today allow searching by CAS Registry Number, and it is used as a global standard.

== Format ==
A CAS Registry Number has no inherent meaning, but is assigned in sequential, increasing order when the substance is identified by CAS scientists for inclusion in the CAS Registry database.

A CAS RN is separated by hyphens into three parts, the first consisting from two up to seven digits, the second consisting of two digits, and the third consisting of a single digit serving as a check digit. This format gives CAS a maximum capacity of 1,000,000,000 unique numbers. (In practice, the 100 possibilities of the second part is rarely used -- entries sharing the same first-part are added in the same "batch" and almost always chemically related to each other.)

The check digit is found by taking the last digit times 1, the preceding digit times 2, the preceding digit times 3 etc., adding all these up and computing the sum modulo 10. For example, the CAS number of water is 7732-18-5: the checksum 5 is calculated as (8×1 + 1×2 + 2×3 + 3×4 + 7×5 + 7×6) = 105; 105 mod 10 = 5.

== Granularity ==
The CAS Registry accepts entries that are (1) descriptive of matter consisting of chemical elements, (2) distinct from existing ones, and (3) present in scientific literature. The definition of "distinct" excludes different phases of the same substance (e.g. water and ice), but includes narrowing of existing concepts (e.g. carbon vs. graphite and diamond; isotope-labelled forms of an existing compound).

- Stereoisomers and racemic mixtures are assigned discrete CAS Registry Numbers: L-epinephrine has 51-43-4, D-epinephrine has 150-05-0, and racemic DL-epinephrine has 329-65-7.
- Different phases do not receive different CAS RNs (liquid water and ice both have 7732-18-5), but different crystal structures do (carbon in general is 7440-44-0, graphite is 7782-42-5 and diamond is 7782-40-3)
- Commonly encountered mixtures of known or unknown composition may receive a CAS RN; examples are Leishman stain (12627-53-1) and mustard oil (8007-40-7).
- Some chemical elements are discerned by their oxidation state, e.g. the element chromium has 7440-47-3, the trivalent Cr(III) has 16065-83-1 and the hexavalent Cr(VI) species have 18540-29-9.
- Occasionally whole classes of molecules receive a single CAS RN: the class of enzymes known as alcohol dehydrogenases has 9031-72-5. This assignment is specifically mapped to the concept of Enzyme Commission number (EC#) 1.1.1.1, which includes all enzymes with the ability to catalyze the dehydrogenation of alcohol.
  - This does not preclude more specific entries from being made. For example, the tissue-type plasminogen activator (TPA) is EC# 3.4.21.68, corresponding to CAS RN 139639-23-9. Recombinant protein versions of human TPA have their own CAS RN such as 105857-23-6 (Alteplase).

== Search engines ==
The Chemical Abstracts Service subscription includes an official search service. The Service ("CAS Data") provides information on the chemical itself, its mentions in published scholarly works and patents, curated biological and chemical reaction data, as well as listings of commercial sources and details on using a substance in a formulation. A subset of the registry can be accessed through the free-of-charge CAS Common Chemistry, which provides identifying information for the chemical in question. Additional, third-party chemical databases that offer searching by CAS number include:

- CHEMINDEX Search via Canadian Centre for Occupational Health and Safety
- ChemIDplus Advanced via United States National Library of Medicine
- ChemSpider (Royal Society of Chemistry)
- European chemical Substances Information System via the website of Royal Society of Chemistry
- HSNO Chemical Classification Information Database via Environmental Risk Management Authority
- Search Tool of Australian Inventory of Chemical Substances via Australian Inventory of Chemical Substances
- USEPA CompTox Chemicals Dashboard
- PubChem (National Center for Biotechnology Information)
- ChEBI (European Bioinformatics Institute)

== See also ==
- Academic publishing
- Beilstein Registry Number
- Chemical file format
- Dictionary of chemical formulas
- EC# (EINECS and ELINCS, European Community)
- EC number (Enzyme Commission)
- International Union of Pure and Applied Chemistry
- List of CAS numbers by chemical compound
- MDL number
- PubChem
- Registration authority
- UN number
