= MINAS =

Database of Metal Ions in Nucleic AcidS

Content
- Description: Metal Ions in Nucleic AcidS.

Contact
- Research center: University of Zurich
- Laboratory: Institute of Inorganic Chemistry
- Authors: Joachim Schnabl
- Primary citation: Schnabl & al. (2012)
- Release date: 2011

Access
- Website: Official website

MINAS is a database of metal ions in nucleic acids.
