= BIOVIA =

American software company

- Type: Subsidiary
- Traded as: Nasdaq: DASTY
- Industry: Life sciences, materials science, CPG, automotive, aerospace, energy, academic, manufacturing, technology
- Founded: 2001; 25 years ago
- Headquarters: San Diego, California, US; Cambridge, UK; Tokyo, Japan
- Key people: Jason Benedict (CEO); Julie Page, VP Quality Compliance & Global Customer Support
- Revenue: US$155 million
- Number of employees: 700+
- Website: www.3ds.com/products/biovia

BIOVIA is a software company headquartered in the United States, with representation in Europe and Asia. It provides software for chemical, materials and bioscience research for the pharmaceutical, biotechnology, consumer packaged goods, aerospace, energy and chemical industries.

Previously named Accelrys, it is a wholly owned subsidiary of Dassault Systèmes after an April 2014 acquisition and has been renamed BIOVIA.

== History ==
Accelrys was formed in 2001 as a wholly owned subsidiary of Pharmacopeia, Inc. from the fusion of five companies: Molecular Simulations Inc., Synopsys Scientific Systems Ltd, Oxford Molecular, the Genetics Computer Group (GCG), and Synomics Ltd. MSI, itself a result of the combination of Biodesign, Cambridge Molecular Design, Polygen and, later, Biocad and Biosym Technologies.

In late 2003, Pharmacopeia, Inc. separated its drug discovery and software development businesses. The drug discovery company retained the name Pharmacopeia and remained in Princeton, New Jersey, while the software company moved to San Diego, California.

In 2004, Accelrys acquired SciTegic, producer of the Pipeline pilot software.

Accelrys managed a nanotechnology consortium producing software tools for rational nanodesign from 2004 to 2010.

In 2010, Symyx Technologies was merged with Accelrys.

In May 2011, the company acquired Contur Software AB, an electronic lab notebook software firm.

In January 2012, Accelrys acquired VelQuest, a maker of pharmaceutical and medical device-related software, for $35 million in cash.

In May 2012, Accelrys purchased Hit Explorer Operating System (HEOS) - a SaaS system that provides groups with project information in the cloud and access to biological assay results, analytics, chemical registration and pharmacokinetics data - from Scynexis.

In October 2012, Accelrys acquired Aegis Analytical Corp. for $30 million in cash, expanding Accelrys’ reach for customers in the move from the lab to the manufacturing floor. Aegis had been developing its Discoverant enterprise-class software system since 1997 to aggregate, contextualize and analyze on-line and off-line process development, manufacturing and quality data, enabling process improvement and quality by design, for its customers in the highly regulated biotech and pharma industries.

In January 2013, Accelrys acquired Swiss biosciences systems integrator Vialis AG for $5 million in cash.

In September 2013, Accelrys acquired Environmental Health & Safety (EH&S) compliance provider ChemSW.

On January 30, 2014 Dassault Systèmes of France announced the acquisition of Accelrys in an all-cash tender offer for at $12.50 per share, representing a fully diluted equity value for Accelrys of approximately $750 million. After the acquisition, Accelrys was renamed BIOVIA.

== Products ==
- The Accelrys Enterprise Platform, a scientifically aware, service-oriented architecture (SOA) spanning data management and informatics, enterprise lab management, modeling and simulation, and workflow automation.
- Pipeline Pilot, a program that aggregates and provides immediate access to the volumes of disparate research data locked in silos, automates the scientific analysis of that data, and enables researchers to rapidly explore, visualize and report research results.
- ISIS/Draw, a chemical drawing tool.
- ISIS/Base, a personal chemical database counterpart.
- ISIS/Host, a chemical structure database that uses Oracle
- Accelrys Draw, a chemical drawing tool.
- Accelrys Direct, a chemical substance database that uses Oracle's data cartridge technology.
- The Available Chemicals Directory (ACD) a compilation of supplier catalogues that is searchable by substructure.
- The Accelrys Process Management and Compliance Suite, a "combination of software products for scientists working in early and mid-stage analytical, formulation and process/bioprocess development ... through to stability, material and release testing during late-stage quality control and commercial production." The Suite streamlines product development
- Symyx Notebook by Accelrys, an Electronic lab notebook.
- Materials Studio, a suite of modeling and simulation programs for material science.
- Discovery Studio, a suite of modeling and simulation programs for life sciences.
- Contur ELN
- Externalized Collaboration Suite
- Discoverant, a validation-ready software system for data access, automated aggregation and contextualization, analysis and reporting. It supports Industry 4.0 strategies by enabling collaboration across data silos for process understanding and product quality improvement, allowing lower cost production of higher quality therapeutics and other products.
- iLabber
- Experiment Knowledge Base
- Lab Execution System (LES)

Commercial versions of otherwise academically licensed programs:

- CHARMM (Chemistry at Harvard Macromolecular Mechanics) is commercially available from Accelrys. In October 2013, Martin

Karplus of Harvard University, Michael Levitt of Stanford University and Arieh Warshel of the University of Southern California were awarded the 2013 Nobel Prize in chemistry for their work in modeling and simulation including CHARMM.

- MODELLER
