= Spectral Database for Organic Compounds =

Chemical database

Spectral Database for Organic Compounds (SDBS)
Content
- Description: Raman, FT-IR, EI-MS, ^{1}H-NMR, ^{13}C-NMR and EPR spectra of organic compounds.

Contact
- Research center: National Institute of Advanced Industrial Science and Technology (AIST), Japan
- Authors: Yamaji, T., Saito, T., Hayamizu, K., Yanagisawa, M. Yamamoto, O. Wasada, N., Someno, K., Kinugasa, S., Tanabe, K., Tamura, T. and Hiraishi, J.
- Release date: 1997

Access
- Website: http://sdbs.db.aist.go.jp/sdbs/cgi-bin/cre_index.cgi

The Spectral Database for Organic Compounds (SDBS) is a free online searchable database hosted by the National Institute of Advanced Industrial Science and Technology (AIST) in Japan, that contains spectral data for ca 34,000 organic molecules. The database is available in English and in Japanese and it includes six types of spectra: laser Raman spectra, electron ionization mass spectra (EI-MS), Fourier-transform infrared (FT-IR) spectra, ^{1}H nuclear magnetic resonance (^{1}H-NMR) spectra, ^{13}C nuclear magnetic resonance (^{13}C-NMR) spectra and electron paramagnetic resonance (EPR) spectra. The construction of the database started in 1982. Most of the spectra were acquired and recorded in AIST and some of the collections are still being updated. Since 1997, the database can be accessed free of charge, but its use requires agreeing to a disclaimer; the total accumulated number of times accessed reached 550 million by the end of January, 2015.

== Content ==
=== Laser Raman spectra ===
The database contains ca 3,500 Raman spectra. The spectra were recorded in the region of 4,000 – 0 cm^{−1} with an excitation wavelength of 4,800 nm and a slit width of 100 – 200 micrometers. This collection is not being updated.

=== Electron ionization mass (EI-MS) spectra ===
The EI-MS spectra were measured in a JEOL JMS-01SG or a JEOL JMS-700 spectrometers, by the electron ionization method, with an electronic accelerating voltage of 75 eV and an ion accelerating voltage of 8 – 10 kV. The direct or reservoir inlet systems were used. The accuracy of the mass number is 0.5. This collection contains ca. 25,000 EI-MS spectra and is being updated.

=== Fourier-transform infrared (FT-IR) spectra ===
The FT-IR spectra were recorded using a Nicolet 170SX or a JASCO FT/IR-410 spectrometer. For spectra recorded in the Nicolet spectrometer, the data were stored at intervals of 0.5 cm^{−1} in the 4,000 – 2,000 cm^{−1} region and of 0.25 cm^{−1} in the 2,000 – 400 cm^{−1} region and the spectral resolution was 0.25 cm^{−1}. For spectra recorded in the JASCO spectrometer, the resolution as well as the intervals was 0.5 cm^{−1}. Samples from solids were prepared using the KBr disc or the Nujol paste methods, samples from liquids were prepared with the liquid film method. This collections contains ca 54,100 spectra and is being updated.

=== ^{1}H NMR spectra ===
The ^{1}H NMR spectra were recorded at a resonance frequency of 400 MHz with a resolution of 0.0625 Hz or at 90 MHz with a resolution of 0.125 Hz. The spectral acquisition was carried out using a flip angle of 22.5 – 30.0 degrees and a pulse repetition time of 30 seconds. Samples were prepared by dissolution in deuterated chloroform (CDCl_{3}), deuterium oxide (D_{2}O), or deuterated dimethylsulfoxide (DMSO-d_{6}). Each spectrum is accompanied by a list of peaks with their respective intensities and chemical shifts reported in ppm and in Hz. Most spectra show the peak assignment. This collection contains ca 15,900 spectra and is being updated.

=== ^{13}C NMR spectra ===
The ^{13}C NMR spectra were recorded at several spectrometers with resonance frequencies ranging from 15 MHz to 100 MHz and a resolution ranging from 0.025 to 0.045 ppm. Spectra were acquired using a pulse flip angle of 22.5 – 45 degrees and a pulse repetition time of 4 – 7 seconds. Samples were prepared by dissolution in CDCl_{3}, D_{2}O, or DMSO-d_{6}. Each spectrum is accompanied by a list of the observed peaks with their respective chemical shifts in ppm and their intensities. Most spectra show the peak assignment. This collection contains ca 14,200 spectra and is being updated.

=== Electron paramagnetic resonance (EPR) spectra ===
This collection contains ca 2,000 spectra. The measuring conditions and sample preparation is described for each particular spectrum. This collection stopped being updated in 1987.

== Searching the database ==
=== Direct searches ===
The database can be searched by entering one or more of the following parameters: chemical name (is possible to request partial or full matching), molecular formula, number of different types of atoms present in the molecule (as a single value or as a range of values), molecular weight (as a single value or as a range of values), CAS Registry Number or SDBS number. In all cases “%” or “*” can be used as wildcards. The result of the search includes all the available spectra for the search parameters entered. Results can be sorted by molecular weight, number of carbons or SDBS number in ascending or descending order.

=== Reverse searches ===
If a spectrum of an unknown chemical compound is available, a reverse search can be carried out by entering the values of the chemical shift, frequency or mass of the peaks in the NMR, FT-IR or EI-MS spectrum respectively. This type of search affords all the chemical compounds in the database that have the entered spectral characteristics.
