= MDL Information Systems =

Former R&D informatics provider

MDL Information Systems, Inc. was a provider of R&D informatics products for the life sciences and chemicals industries. The company was launched as a computer-aided drug design firm (originally named Molecular Design Limited, Inc.) in January 1978 in Hayward, California. The company was acquired by Symyx Technologies, Inc. in 2007. Subsequently Accelrys merged with Symyx. The Accelrys name was retained for the combined company. In 2014 Accelrys was acquired by Dassault Systèmes. The Accelrys business unit was renamed BIOVIA.

== History ==
Molecular Design Limited, Inc. was founded by Stuart Marson and W. Todd Wipke in 1978.

With 15 years of research on computer synthesis at the University of California, Santa Cruz, Wipke, with Marson, fresh from a Ph.D. at Stanford University and a postdoctoral stint at the University of California, Berkeley, were convinced that computer-assisted molecular design was possible as a commercial enterprise. Employee #3 was Stephen Peacock, a colleague of Marson, and #4 was Jim Dill, a graduate student from Princeton, as was #5, Doug Hounshell, also a graduate of Princeton.

MDL was the first company to provide an interactive graphical registry and full and substructural retrieval. The company's initial products were first-of-their-kind systems for storing and retrieving molecules as graphical structures and for managing databases of chemical reactions and related data. These systems revolutionized the way scientists accessed and managed chemical information in the 1980s.

From its initial pioneering of computer handling of graphical chemical structures with MACCS (Molecular ACCess System) in 1979, MDL continued at the forefront of the field now known as cheminformatics.

In 1985, MDL moved its corporate headquarters from Hayward to a larger campus in San Leandro, CA. In 1987, MDL was purchased by Maxwell Communications Corporation.

In 1993, the company was publicly offered as MDL Information Systems, Inc. (MDLI) on the NASDAQ stock exchange. In 1997, the company was purchased by Reed Elsevier, the Anglo-Dutch publisher and information provider, becoming a wholly owned subsidiary of Elsevier, a publisher of scientific, technical and medical information. In February 2006, Elsevier MDL moved its corporate headquarters from San Leandro to San Ramon, CA.

In October 2007, certain content and software products of Elsevier MDL were acquired by Symyx Technologies, Inc. for $123 million. The newly-combined company offered an expanded set of software solutions and services with the goal to enhance R&D productivity in the life sciences, chemicals and energy industries. As part of the deal, the infrastructure-related software applications and databases of MDL, including CrossFire Beilstein, CrossFire Gmelin, the Patent Chemistry Database, xPharm and PharmaPendium, were retained by Elsevier and integrated within Elsevier's Science & Technology operations.

== See also ==
- Computational chemistry
- Drug development
- Drug discovery
- Drug discovery hit to lead
- Bioinformatics
- Pre-clinical development
- Compound management
