= SPRESI database =

The SPRESI data collection is one of the largest databases for organic chemistry worldwide. The database covers the scientific literature from 1974 to 2014, focusing on organic synthesis. It contains information on 5.8 million chemical structures and 4.6 million chemical reactions abstracted from 700,000 references.

== History ==
Since 1974 the data collection has been jointly built by VINITI(All-Russian Institute of Scientific and Technical Information of the Russian Academy of Sciences, based in Moscow) and ZIC (Zentrale Informationsverarbeitung Chemie, based in east Berlin, up to 1989) and the data are now maintained by the VINITI Institute. Since 1990 InfoChem GmbH, part of DeepMatter Group, based in Munich, Germany, has been the distributor of this data collection and developed the database SPRESIweb and the app SPRESImobile.

== Database Content ==
The SPRESI database contains information on organic substances, including coverage of reactions, structures and properties. Over 32 million records of factual data, such as physical properties (boiling/melting points, refractive indexes, etc.), reaction conditions (catalysts, yields, etc.) and keywords have also been abstracted. Links to the literature in which the substances are described are also given.

== Access ==
The SPRESI data collection can be accessed online via the web-application SPRESI^{web}, developed and distributed by InfoChem. Alternatively the complete set or subsets of the database can be acquired as raw data in SDF/RDF chemical file format.

== References (SPRESI^{web}) ==
Roth, Dana L. (2005). "SPRESIweb 2.1, a Selective Chemical Synthesis and Reaction Database". J. Chem. Inf. Model. 45 (5). American Chemical Society: 1470–1473. doi:10.1021/ci050274b.

Atkins, Peter W.; Eds. Garcia-Martinez, Javier; Serrano-Torregrosa, Elena (2015). Chemistry education: Best practices opportunities and trends. John Wiley and Sons. p. 624. ISBN 978-3-527-33605-0.
