= Reaxys =

Chemical database developed by Elsevier

Reaxys is a web-based tool for the retrieval of information about chemical compounds and data from published literature, including journals and patents. The information includes chemical compounds, chemical reactions, chemical properties, related bibliographic data, substance data with synthesis planning information, as well as experimental procedures from selected journals and patents. It is licensed by Elsevier.

Reaxys was launched in 2009 as the successor to the CrossFire databases. It was developed to provide research chemists with access to current and historical, relevant, organic, inorganic and organometallic chemistry information, from reliable sources via an easy-to-use interface.

== Scope and access ==
One of the primary goals of Reaxys is to provide research chemists with access to experimentally measured data – reactions, physical, chemical or pharmacological – in one universal and factual platform. Content covers organic, medicinal, synthetic, agro, fine, catalyst, inorganic and process chemistry and provides information on structures, reactions, and citations. Additional features include a synthesis planner and access to commercial availability information. There have been regular releases and enhancements to Reaxys since it was first launched, including similarity searching.

Reaxys provides links to Scopus for all matching articles and interoperability with ScienceDirect. Access to the database is subject to an annual license agreement.

== Core data ==
The content covers more than 200 years of chemistry and has been abstracted from several thousands of journal titles, books and patents. Today the data is drawn from selected journals (400 titles) and chemistry patents, and the excerption process for each reaction or substance data included needs to meet three conditions:

1. It has a chemical structure
2. It is supported by an experimental fact (property, preparation, reaction)
3. It has a credible citation

Journals covered include Advanced Synthesis and Catalysis, Journal of American Chemical Society, Journal of Organometallic Chemistry, Synlett and Tetrahedron.

Patents in Reaxys come from the International Patent Classes:

- C07 Organic Chemistry
- A61K and secondary IPC C07 [Medicinal, Dental, Cosmetic Preparations]
- A01N
- C09B Dyes

== Comparison with other chemical databases ==
Only a very limited number of studies compared Reaxys with other databases, that provide chemical search functionality, such as SciFinder, ChEMBL, PubChem and Questel-Orbit. For example, the most comprehensive study published in 2020 by researchers from the University of Sydney concluded, that "Reaxys is definitely the first choice, due to both its wealth of data and its precise search facilities...but for less common data and spectra SciFinder contains often more information than Reaxys. PubChem should also be included, not only because of its size and accessibility... Reaxys has well over 100 times the number of experimental property data points <as SciFinder>... In the case of Reaxys and SciFinder, the natural language query algorithms in Reaxys are displayable, but in SciFinder the algorithms are proprietary and not available."

== See also ==
- Beilstein database
