= National Institute of Advanced Industrial Science and Technology =

Japanese research facility headquartered in Tokyo

Coordinates: 36.06024°N 140.13310°E

- 産業技術総合研究所

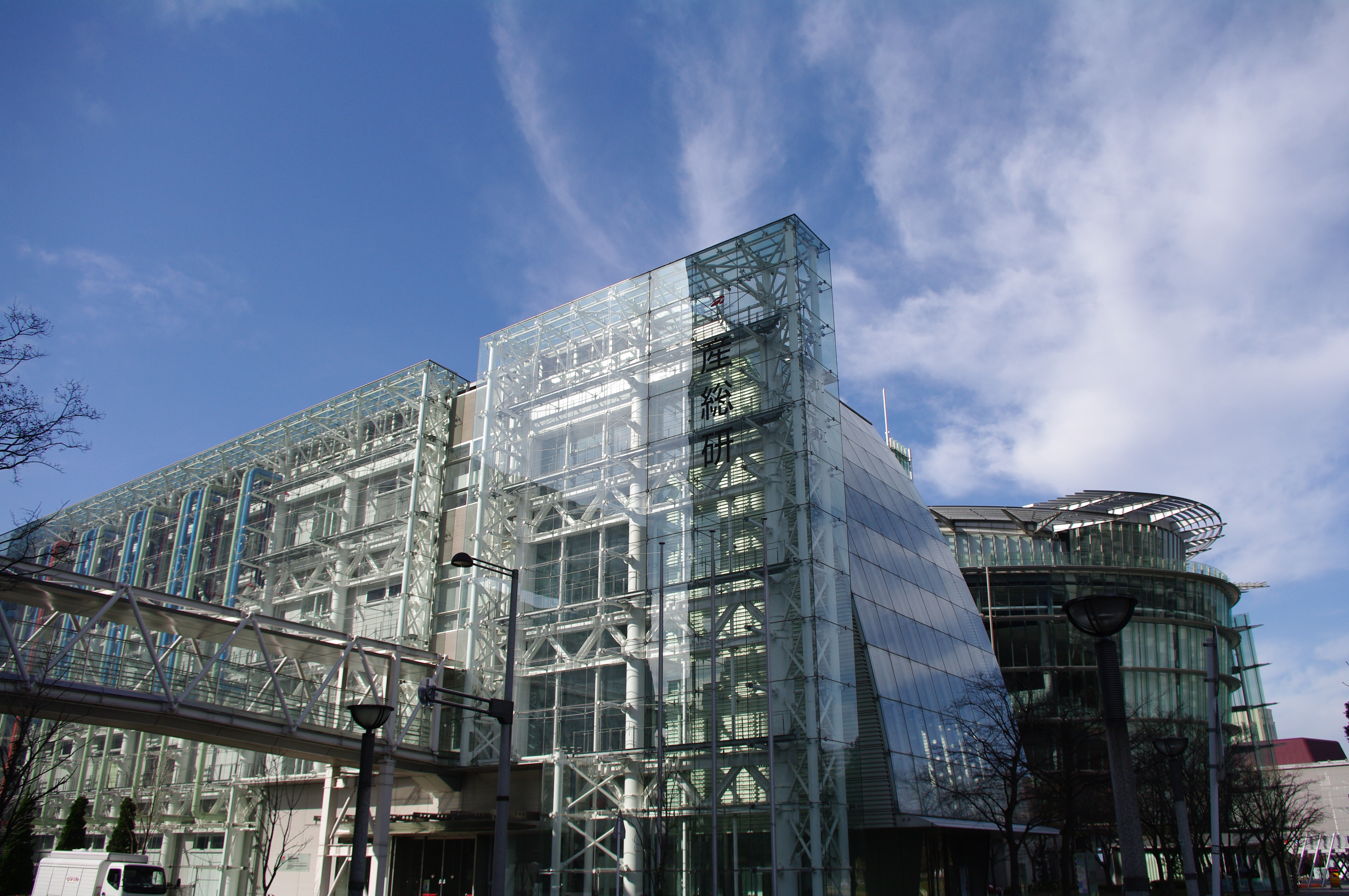
- AIST Tokyo Waterfront in Odaiba

Research institute overview
- Formed: 2001
- Preceding Research institute: Agency of Industrial Science and Technology
- Headquarters: Tokyo, Japan
- Employees: 2,949
- Research institute executive: Ishimura Kazuhiko, President
- Parent department: Ministry of Economy, Trade and Industry
- Website: aist.go.jp

The National Institute of Advanced Industrial Science and Technology (産業技術総合研究所, Sangyō Gijutsu Sōgō Kenkyū-sho), or AIST, is a Japanese research facility headquartered in Tokyo, and most of the workforce is located in Tsukuba Science City, Ibaraki, and in several cities throughout Japan. The institute is managed to integrate scientific and engineering knowledge to address socio-economic needs. It became a newly designed legal body of Independent Administrative Institution in 2001, remaining under the Ministry of Economy, Trade and Industry.

== History ==
In its present form AIST was established in 2001. However, its predecessor institutes have been operating since 1882. In 2015, it is running more than 40 researching institutes and several branches over Japan including International Metrology Cooperation Office.

== Three missions of AIST ==
- Advanced Research by exploring broad spectra of research fields and integrating multidisciplinary subjects to promote innovation in versatile fields that strengthen the competitiveness of Japanese industries in the world market and create new industries.
- Interdisciplinary and Cross-Disciplinary Research that enables planning long-range governmental policies by exploiting the current and future needs of society.
- Basic Research that maintains and strengthens competitiveness of national science and technology by developing and maintaining high standards of scientific and engineering research under the sole responsibility of AIST.

== Type-I and Type-II basic research ==
The institute attempts to use and integrate scientific and engineering knowledge that is fragmented into various disciplines to address versatile and highly complex socio-economic needs that change rapidly with time.

AIST defines such research as Type-II Basic Research, which integrates multiple disciplines and creates methods for the use of integrated knowledge; traditional basic research is defined as Type-I Basic Research, which is the pursuit and discovery of novel rules, laws and principles that govern natural phenomena.

AIST places its highest priority on the pursuit of complete research, "Full Research", ranging from Type-I Basic Research to the development of products by conducting intensive Type-II Basic Research.

Each Unit of AIST places its highest priorities on establishing an integrated research system that enables researchers with different scientific backgrounds to participate in scenario-oriented research projects to address the needs of society.

== Employees ==
The institute employs researchers of various backgrounds and levels of expertise who carry out research with respect to the three main mission of the institute. The number of employees are as follows:

- Researchers: 2,288

- Tenured researchers: 2,046
- Fixed-term researchers: 242

- Administrative staffs: 661
- Total number of employees: 2,949 (as of April 1, 2012)

== Geological Survey of Japan ==
The Geological Survey of Japan (GSJ) was created from geoscientific research units within AIST in 2001 to replace the old GSJ created in 1882.

== Notable scientists ==
- Hiroyuki Yoshikawa, former President of AIST, University of Tokyo (1993–1997), Science Council of Japan (1997–2003) and International Council for Science (ICSU) (1999–2002)
- Jun Kondo, a famous researcher for the Kondo effect
- Sumio Iijima, the discoverer of the Carbon nanotube
- Yoshinori Tokura, famous for nanotechnology experiments
- Hiromichi Kataura, well known for his research in carbon nanotubes and for the Kataura plot

== Products ==
- HRP-2 Promet, a domestic general helper robot (under development) in joint Humanoid Robotics Project with Kawada Industries.
- HRP-4C, a female humanoid robot.
- Paro, a baby harp seal robot for therapeutic use.
- DeleGate, a multi-purpose application-level gateway / proxy server.
- Spectral Database for Organic Compounds (SDBS), a free online searchable database containing Raman, EPR, FT-IR, EI-MS, ^{1}H-NMR and ^{13}C-NMR spectra of ca 34,000 organic compounds.
- Structure atlas of human genome

== See also ==
- Humanoid Robotics Project
- Independent Administrative Institution (IAI)
- List of Independent Administrative Institutions (Japan)
