= MetaboAnalyst =

Online tools for metabolomic data analysis

MetaboAnalyst is a set of online tools for metabolomic data analysis and interpretation, created by members of the Wishart Research Group at the University of Alberta. It was first released in May 2009 and version 2.0 was released in January 2012. MetaboAnalyst provides a variety of analysis methods that have been tailored for metabolomic data. These methods include metabolomic data processing, normalization, multivariate statistical analysis, and data annotation. The current version is focused on biomarker discovery and classification.

The version 6.0 contains three new modules - tandem MS spectral processing and compound annotation, dose response analysis for chemical risk assessment, and leveraging metabolite-genome wide association analysis and Mendelian randomization for causal analysis.

MetaboAnalyst supports a wide variety of data input types commonly generated by metabolomic studies including GC/LC-MS raw spectra, MS/NMR peak lists, NMR/MS peak intensity table, NMR/MS spectral bins, and metabolite concentrations.

MetaboAnalyst has four modules:

1. Data processing
2. Statistical analysis (one-factor, two-factor, and time-series data)
3. Functional enrichment analysis
4. Metabolic pathway analysis

The table below summarizes the main features of each functional module.

1. Data Processing	2. Statistical Analysis	3. Functional Enrichment Analysis
Peak detection	Univariate analysis	Over representation analysis
Retention time correction	Dimension reduction	Single sample profiling
Peak alignment	Feature selection	Quantitative enrichment analysis
Baseline filtering	Cluster analysis	
Data integrity check	Classification	4. Metabolic Pathway Analysis
Missing value imputation	Two-way ANOVA	Enrichment analysis
	ASCA	Topology analysis
	Temporal comparison	Interactive visualization

MetaboAnalyst generates a PDF report that includes a written record of each analysis step and displays results in graphical and tabular format. Users can also download processed data files and PNG image files.

MetaboAnalyst is part of a suite of metabolomics databases that also includes Human Metabolome Database (HMDB), DrugBank, Toxin and Toxin-Target Database, and The Small Molecule Pathway Database. The HMDB has over 7900 human metabolites and roughly 7200 associated DNA and protein sequences, that are linked to these metabolite entries. While DrugBank includes information on 6707 drugs and 4228 non-redundant drug targets, enzymes, transporters, and carriers, T3DB houses over 2900 common toxins and environmental pollutants. The suite is rounded out by SMPDB with its pathway diagrams for more than 350 human metabolic and disease pathways.

MetaboAnalyst has been used by >500,000 researchers worldwide since 2018. It currently receives >10,000 jobs submitted from >2000 users per weekday.

== See also ==
- MetaboAnalyst Website
- Metabolite Set Enrichment Analysis
- MetPA
- Metabolome
- Metabolomics
