= Metabolomic Pathway Analysis =

Content
- Description: For metabolomic data analysis – specifically for the identification of enriched or important pathways from multiple different organisms

Contact
- Research center: University of Alberta
- Laboratory: David S. Wishart

Access
- Data format: Data Input: Tables of metabolite names and/or concentrations; Data Output: Graphs and tables with embedded hyperlinks
- Website: http://metpa.metabolomics.ca

Miscellaneous
- Data release frequency: Every 1-2 years with periodic corrections and updates
- Curation policy: Manually curated

Metabolomic Pathway Analysis, shortened to MetPA, is a freely available, user-friendly web server to assist with the identification analysis and visualization of metabolic pathways using metabolomic data. MetPA makes use of advances originally developed for pathway analysis in microarray experiments and applies those principles and concepts to the analysis of metabolic pathways. For input, MetPA expects either a list of compound names (identified as statistically significant or significant perturbed) or a metabolite concentration table with phenotypic labels (i.e. sick vs. healthy). The list of compounds can include common names, HMDB IDs or KEGG IDs with one compound per row. Compound concentration tables must have samples in rows and compounds in columns. MetPA's output is a series of tables indicating which pathways are significantly enriched (along with accompanying statistics) as well as a variety of graphs or pathway maps illustrating where and how certain pathways were enriched. MetPA's graphical output uses a colorful Google-Maps visualization system that allows simple, intuitive data exploration that lets users employ a computer mouse or track pad to select, drag and place images and to seamlessly zoom in and out. Users can explore MetPA's output using three different views or levels: 1) a metabolome view; 2) a pathway view; 3) a compound view.

== MetPA Details ==
As noted above MetPA performs two types of pathway analysis: 1) Pathway (or Metabolite Set) Enrichment Analysis; and 2) Pathway Topological Analysis. Pathway Enrichment Analysis (which is similar to MSEA) identifies which metabolic pathways have compounds (from the input lists) that are over-represented and have significant perturbations to their concentrations. MetPA uses a number of robust statistical measures to identify which metabolites (and therefore which pathways) are over-represented. Pathway Topological Analysis measures the centrality of a metabolite in a metabolic network or a metabolic pathway. Central or highly important metabolites are “hubs”, located in the center of a metabolic pathway or process. MetPA employs a number of topological assessment tools to measure centrality or “hubness” in an objective manner (called Pathway Impact). Pathway impact is a combination of the centrality and pathway enrichment results. It is calculated adding up the importance measures of each of the matched metabolites and then dividing by the sum of the importance measures of all metabolites in each pathway.

To begin a session on MetPA users must first have a list of significant compounds derived from a metabolomic tests or compounds and concentration data with information about the phenotype of the organisms under study. The list of compounds can include common names, HMDB IDs or KEGG IDs with one compound per row. Compound concentration tables must have samples in rows and compounds in columns. Once the data is uploaded to MetPA users must choose the organism with which the pathway analysis will be done. Ideally the metabolomic data should be from one of the 15 model organisms listed in the MetPA organism menu. If the organism of interest is not listed, then users may choose a closely related organism. If none of the organisms are thought to be sufficiently close, then users may inquire with the web site developers to see if the organism may be added. Central to the operation of MetPA is its library of metabolic pathways for different model organisms. These were assembled from the KEGG database which were separated into graphical models using the KEGGgraph package. The current MetPA collection contains more than 1170 different metabolic pathways derived from 15 model organisms covering mammals (Humans, Mouse, Rat, Cow, Chicken), fish (Zebrafish), plants (Arabidopsis, Rice) insects (Drosophila) and microbes (Yeast, Escherichia coli, Bacillus subtilis, Staphylococcus aureus, Pseudomonas putida, and Thermotoga maritima.). To simplify viewing and navigation on the server, and to assist with the topological analyses, all the KEGG pathways in MetPA are presented as a network with metabolites serving as nodes and reactions as edges. MetPA provides an extensive tutorial explaining how to upload data and how interpret its output. In 2011 MetPA functions were expanded and integrated into MetaboAnalyst. This integration allows users to perform a more complete analysis and to link to other data processing and data interpretation functions available through MetaboAnalyst.
