= Metabolite Set Enrichment Analysis =

Content
- Description: For metabolomic data analysis – specifically for the identification of obvious as well as ‘subtle but coordinated’ changes among a group of related metabolites

Contact
- Research center: University of Alberta
- Laboratory: David S. Wishart

Access
- Data format: Data Input: Tables of metabolite names and/or concentrations; Data Output: Graphs and tables with embedded hyperlinks
- Website: http://www.msea.ca

Miscellaneous
- Data release frequency: Every 1-2 years with periodic corrections and updates
- Curation policy: Manually curated

Metabolite Set Enrichment Analysis (MSEA) is a method designed to help metabolomics researchers identify and interpret patterns of metabolite concentration changes in a biologically meaningful way. It is conceptually similar to another widely used tool developed for transcriptomics called Gene Set Enrichment Analysis or GSEA. GSEA uses a collection of predefined gene sets to rank the lists of genes obtained from gene chip studies. By using this “prior knowledge” about gene sets researchers are able to readily identify significant and coordinated changes in gene expression data while at the same time gaining some biological context. MSEA does the same thing by using a collection of predefined metabolite pathways and disease states obtained from the Human Metabolome Database. MSEA is offered as a service both through a stand-alone web server and as part of a larger metabolomics analysis suite called MetaboAnalyst.

== MSEA Web Server ==
The MSEA web server is a freely available web server for performing metabolite set enrichment analysis on human or mammalian metabolomics data. The required input is either a list of compound names or compound names and concentrations. The output is a set of graphs and tables with embedded hyperlinks to the pertinent pathway images and descriptors. The Metabolite Set Enrichment Analysis offered by the web server is based on a curated library of more 5000 predefined metabolite sets covering various human metabolic pathways (nearly 100), hundreds of human disease states (in 3 different biofluids), human biofluid and tissue locations as well as human SNP-metabolite associations (4500 different SNP associations). MSEA also allows users to upload custom metabolite sets for more specialized analysis (such as non-mammalian MSEA work). Three different enrichment analyses are supported by the server: 1) overrepresentation analysis (ORA); 2) single sample profiling (SSP) and 3) quantitative enrichment analysis (QEA). ORA analysis only needs a list of compound names. SSP and QEA need both compound names and their concentrations. Workflows, examples and other screenshot tutorials on how to use the server are available on the MSEA website. The MSEA server also offers a number of other functions including the conversion between metabolite common names, synonyms, and major database identifiers.

In 2011 MSEA functions were expanded and integrated into MetaboAnalyst. This integration allows users to perform a more complete analysis and to link to other data processing and data interpretation functions available in MetaboAnalyst. MSEA is also offered in the MeltDB software platform.

== See also ==
- MetaboAnalyst
- MetPA
- Metabolome
- Metabolomics
