= Vivienne Elanta =

Australian environmental activist

Vivienne Heloise Elanta (22 June 1951 – 16 August 2004) was a Western Australian environmental activist.

== Personal life ==
Born in Germany, Elanta was the eldest of Gertraud Adler and Robert Neuman's five children. She had just six years of schooling. At an early age she moved with her family to Monrovia, Liberia, where her parents managed a rubber plantation, and there was no schooling available until she was nine.

She was thirteen when they moved to Johannesburg, South Africa, and for eight years, from the age of 15 she worked without pay on her parents' farms - including one in northern New South Wales, where her family emigrated in 1972. She raised her daughter, in great difficulty, for the first five years as a single parent.

Vivienne Elanta did more than 20 personal development courses, and her partner John Croft, commented, "I found it amazing the way she transformed herself from being a victim and coming eventually to see her difficult childhood as something that equipped her to have special insight into the lives of people less fortunate than herself."

Elanta had a keen interest in environmental causes and discovered the deep ecology work of Joanna Macy and John Seed, which gives priority to the biosphere in the use of resources. "She didn't feel she had a purpose until she discovered deep ecology. Her purpose then was to make people aware of our part in something much older and deeper than themselves".

== Activism ==
In 1986 with her partner John Croft she co-founded the Gaia Foundation of Australia, which was inspired by the Gaia hypothesis of James Lovelock and Lynn Margulis, and this became Elanta's vehicle for non violent activism. Its goals were personal growth, strengthening the community and service to the Earth. It has now more than 100 members and has conducted over 600 projects.

Elanta initiated a program that reintroduced to Victoria Park, a suburb of Perth, Western Australia, two species of frog that had not been recorded there for 50 years, and ran a street verge revegetation project. She also became involved in direct action, running workshops to train fellow activists and joining forest protest camps in the south west region, as a part of the campaign to prevent the clearfelling of old-growth native forests.

When the State Government decided to allow mineral mining in National Parks, she and a group of others carried out a symbolic exploration for minerals in the Bunbury offices of Cable Sands. They were arrested and charged.

In a campaign to try to stop bushland from being cleared at Hepburn Heights, in Perth's northern suburbs, she dressed as a kangaroo to attract media attention and squatted in a tree platform. She was also scooped up and thrown to the ground by a bulldozer, which she then climbed on while it was in motion. She was part of a group that was arrested and charged after lying down in front of a train to stop it being loaded with woodchips, in Manjimup.

"Her family had seen trains carrying Jews to the gas ovens, but had done nothing about it. Vivienne said at the time that she couldn't stand by and see the trains loaded with woodchips destroying the external lungs of the planet in the name of so-called progress"

In 1985, Elanta was involved in helping establish the Greens Western Australia, in the western and northern suburbs. She also stood for the State Legislative Assembly Seat of Marmion in 1993. Following Elanta's death, Greens MLC Chrissy Sharp paid tribute to her in the Western Australian Legislative Council. She said,

"The way Vivienne lived her life touched and inspired many people. She had an absolute feeling for mother earth. She had a most extraordinary garden that was abundant in vegetables, flowers and frogs. Everything that she touched grew. In fact, the first time that I met Vivienne was about 20 years ago when she visited my farm with a famous Australian forest activist by the name of John Seed who was travelling around the State giving a series of meetings. While the meeting was taking place at my farm, Vivienne was out in my garden, tending it for me. That is just one example of the sort of person that she was and how she was constantly living with an awareness of the needs of the people around her and of the earth around her."

One of Elanta's biggest undertakings was helping to organise the Pilgrimage Project in 1997. Thirty people, including two from Chernobyl, scene of the 1986 nuclear disaster, travelled by bus around Australia to draw attention to Australia's role in the nuclear industry. In the ABC program, "The Spirit of Things", just after the S11 tragedy, Elanta said "55-day pilgrimage on a bus visiting Aboriginal communities who are custodians of the particular lands on which uranium mines are, or are pegged for uranium mining, and our work there was very much of a spiritual nature as well as a political, to bring both together, that the land is sacred, and that this is as much a spiritual as a political issue. And so we brought all that knowledge from the Aboriginal elders back to Canberra, where our sisters shared that with the politicians, that it is important to leave the uranium in the ground, that land is sacred and we need to honour that.".

== Death ==
At the time of her death, on the 16 August 2004 she was doing a Murdoch University degree course (which she helped establish) in "Gaia philosophy and environmental ethics". That year she won the Vice Chancellor's Award for Academic Excellence.

From her deathbed, Elanta suggested that cancer is a breakdown in the communication between the cancerous tissue and the body of the person carrying the illness. It draws attention to the similarity between cancer and our present condition, and suggests that cancers "come as messengers, to come home to our bodies and come home to the Earth".

In the adjournment speech of the Western Australian Parliament, Dr Christine Sharp quoted one of Elanta's poems and added, "Members can see that this was a remarkable and wise woman whom we will all miss greatly."

About 250 friends and relatives celebrated her life at a funeral service in Kings Park, Western Australia where a rainbow coloured bracelet was given to everyone. Part of the blessing was; "Wear it constantly and use it as a catalyst for personal activism in your daily life. May you draw strength and inspiration from her outrageous courage, passion and love of the Earth and all her creatures, human and more than human".

To honour her memory as "an enthusiastic and excellent student" who designed her own degree in environmental ethics, and because "her example continues to inspire and enlighten. In memory of Elanta the ISTP has set up a new award for academic and environmental excellence called The Vivienne Elanta Yummy Book Fund." This award started in 2005.

There is a street name been proposed to honour Vivienne in the Canberra suburb of Wright.
