= Gary Siuzdak =

American chemist

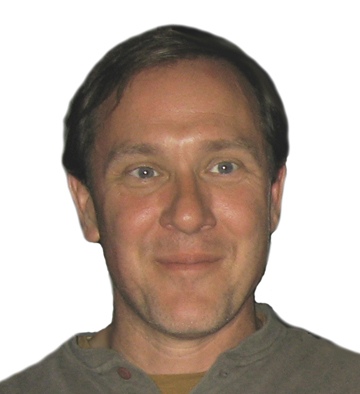
- Born: December 29, 1961 (age 64)
- Scientific career
- Fields: Analytical Chemistry, Metabolomics

Gary Siuzdak is an American chemist best known for his work in the field of metabolomics, activity metabolomics (a termed coined in 2019), and mass spectrometry. His lab discovered indole-3-propionic acid as a gut bacteria derived metabolite in 2009. He is currently the Professor and Director of The Center for Metabolomics and Mass Spectrometry at Scripps Research in La Jolla, California. Siuzdak has also made contributions to virus analysis, viral structural dynamics, as well as developing mass spectrometry imaging technology using nanostructured surfaces. The Siuzdak lab is also responsible for creating the research tools eXtensible Computational Mass Spectrometry (XCMS), METLIN, METLIN Neutral Loss and Q-MRM. As of January 2021, the XCMS/METLIN platform has over 50,000 registered users.

Siuzdak studied chemistry (B.S.) and applied mathematics (B.A.) at Rhode Island College. He then went to Dartmouth College for his graduate work where he built his first mass spectrometer to perform multi-photon ionization mass spectrometry experiments and occasionally competed in powerlifting. At Dartmouth he received his Ph.D. in Physical Chemistry (March 29, 1990) and on April 1, 1990, started at Scripps Research. In 2017 Siuzdak received an honorary doctorate (with Emmanuelle Charpentier) from Umeå University for his work in metabolomics. Siuzdak received and gave the Michael L. Gross Award lecture in 2019 and was made a Lifetime Honorary Fellow from the Metabolomics Society. Siuzdak has hundreds of papers and has authored two books: Mass Spectrometry for Biotechnology (1996) and The Expanding Role of Mass Spectrometry in Biotechnology (2003) as well as The Expanding Role of Mass Spectrometry in Biotechnology 2nd Ed. (2006).

== Notable research ==
From 1994 to the present the Siuzdak lab has been working on activity metabolomics. using liquid chromatography mass spectrometry-based metabolomics to identify metabolites that alter phenotype. His initial efforts with Richard Lerner, used liquid chromatography mass spectrometry to perform metabolomic experiments on the cerebral spinal fluid of sleep deprived animals. cis-9,10-octadecenoamide, a novel lipid hormone (also known as oleamide), was observed and shown to have sleep inducing properties. This work is one of the earliest such experiments combining liquid chromatography mass spectrometry and metabolomics to identify active metabolites. Another notable activity metabolomics effort with Oscar Yanes (Spain) identified neuroprotectin D1 as a metabolite that promotes stem cell differentiation.

In 1996 whole virus analysis was performed with an electrospray ionization mass spectrometer where the virus was collected and successfully tested for viability. Later, he and his collaborators provided the first example of a whole intact virus (tobacco mosaic virus) being mass measured using a charge detection mass spectrometer, an instrument designed by Henry Benner and Stephen Fuerstenau at Lawrence Berkeley National Labs.

In 1999, the Siuzdak lab described the use of nanostructures to enhance desorption/ionization on porous silicon of small molecules (DIOS), this is also known as the first surface-based example of surface-assisted laser desorption/ionization mass spectrometry (SALDI-MS). This technology went on to be expanded using fluorinated initiator molecules used within the porous silicon and was described as Nanostructure Initiator Mass Spectrometry (NIMS), it is also known as Nanostructure Imaging Mass Spectrometry (NIMS) because of its expanded application to imaging.

In 2005, the Siuzdak lab was engaged in identifying dysregulated metabolic peaks from liquid chromatography mass spectrometry data sets, to address the issue retention time alignment they developed the first algorithm that allowed for the nonlinear alignment of metabolomics data called XCMS.

From the early 2000s to the present, the Siuzdak lab created and has been expanding the tandem mass spectrometry database known as METLIN. METLIN is made up solely of experimental data generated from high resolution tandem mass spectrometry instrumentation, all of the data is derived from molecular standards. METLIN (as of May 2025) has over 960,000 molecular standards with experimental tandem mass spectrometry data. METLIN is unique with respect to its size, as other databases are over an order of magnitude smaller, and it is also unique because all of METLIN's tandem mass spectrometry data has been systematically generated at multiple collision energies and in positive and negative ionization modes.

In 2020, the Siuzdak lab building off their work with Xavi Domingo and METLIN, developed Enhanced In-Source Fragmentation/Annotation (EISA) to facilitate the fragmentation, identification, and quantification (via Q-MRM) of molecules without the use of tandem mass spectrometry. And uMRM to facility MRM generation after removal of isotopes and in-source fragments, all without the us of authentic standards.

Siuzdak’s recent work has focused on the impact of in-source fragmentation (ISF) and other source-derived processes in mass spectrometry, demonstrating that many signals detected in LC–MS experiments can originate from ion-source–generated artifacts rather than distinct endogenous molecules. Related studies, including work by Richard Zare and colleagues on electrospray-driven chemical transformations (“in-source chemistry”), have further highlighted the potential contribution of ion-source processes to the large number of molecular features commonly observed in untargeted mass spectrometry experiments.
