= Bovine Metabolome Database =

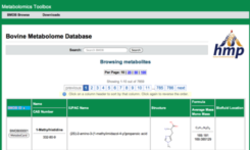
Bovine metabolomic database

Bovine Metabolome Database is a free web database about metabolites information of bovine (cow). It collects 7859 metabolites totally. Each metabolite host properties like CAS name, IUPAC name, structure diagram, formula, and biofluid location. It fills the lack of the information in bovine field. This project is supported by Genome Alberta & Genome Canada, a not-for-profit organization that is leading Canada's national genomics strategy with $600 million in funding from the federal government. Bovine Metabolome Database's protocol is available via Bovine Metabolome Database website.

== See also ==
- HMDB
- Drugbank
