= Volatolomics =

Volatolomics is a branch of chemistry that studies volatile organic compounds (VOCs) emitted by a biological system, under specific experimental conditions.

== Etymology ==
According to the Oxford English Dictionary, the suffix ‘omics’ refers to ‘the totality of some sort’. In biology, ‘omics’ techniques are used for the high-throughput analysis of DNA sequences and epigenetic modifications (genomics), mRNA and miRNA transcripts (transcriptomics), expressed proteins (proteomics), as well as synthesised metabolites (metabolomics) in a biological system (cell, tissue, organism, etc.) under a given set of experimental conditions.

Due to the high number of variables that are measured simultaneously, these techniques provide large and complex datasets that require adapted tools for data analysis and interpretation.

== Key concepts ==
The European Council directive 1999/13/EC defines volatile organic compounds (VOCs) as “any organic compound having at 293.15 K a vapor pressure of 0.01 kPa or more, or having a corresponding volatility under the particular conditions of use”.

In our daily life, these molecules are notably responsible for the flavor of food products, as well as of the fragrance of essential oils used in the cosmetics industry.

In nature, these molecules are produced by bacteria and fungi.

They are also synthesized by plants (flowers, fruits, leaves and roots) and animals (humans, insects, etc.).

The profiling of VOCs emitted by living organisms takes an increasing importance in various scientific domains like in medicine, in food sciences or in chemical ecology.

For instance, in medicine, non-invasive diagnosis techniques of cancer based on the profiling of VOCs from the exhaled breath have been developed. To this end, a variety of novel sensing approaches and nanomaterial based sensors are being used in volatolomics research.

In the field of chemical ecology, gas chromatography coupled to mass spectrometry (GC-MS) is often used to characterize the volatile semiochemicals involved in the biotic interactions taking place aboveground and belowground between plants, insects and phytopathogens.
