= Murdoch University =

Public university in Western Australia

- Shield
- Motto: Wajuk: Ngala Kwop Biddi
- Motto in English: "Building a brighter future, together"
- Type: Public research university
- Established: 25 July 1973; 53 years ago
- Accreditation: TEQSA
- Academic affiliations: Innovative Research Universities (IRU)
- Budget: A$466.94M (2023)
- Visitor: Governor of Western Australia (ex officio)
- Chancellor: Gail McGowan
- Vice-Chancellor: Andrew Deeks
- Academic staff: 1,284 (FTE, 2023)
- Administrative staff: 1,821 (FTE, 2023)
- Total staff: 3,105 (FTE, 2023)
- Students: 24,051 (2023)
- Undergraduates: 16,766 (2023)
- Postgraduates: 7,305 (2023)
- Location: 90 South Street, Murdoch, Western Australia, 6150, Australia
- Campus: 277 ha (684.5 acres); Urban and parkland
- Named after: Walter Murdoch
- Colours: Amaranth Red
- Nickname: Vikings
- Sporting affiliations: UniSport; EAEN
- Mascot: Victor the Viking
- Website: www.murdoch.edu.au
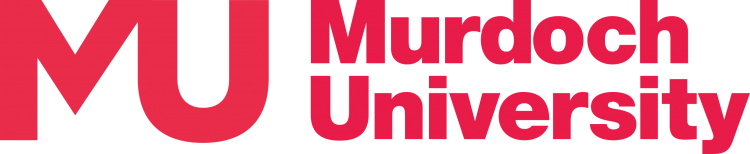

Murdoch University is a public university in Perth, Western Australia, with additional campuses in Singapore and Dubai. It began operations as the state's second university on 25 July 1973, and accepted its first undergraduate students in 1975. Its name is taken from Walter Murdoch, the Founding Professor of English and former Chancellor of the University of Western Australia. The main campus is located in Murdoch, a suburb of Perth.

The university is a verdant university and a member of the Innovative Research Universities. In 2018, Murdoch University was recognised as producing the most employable graduates of all Australian universities after three years of graduating from their courses. In 2019, the university ranked third in overall student satisfaction amongst all public universities in Western Australia.

== History ==
In 1962, the Government of Western Australia earmarked an area of land in Bull Creek to be the site of a future, second, state university. Integral to the planning of the creation of Western Australia's second university was the planning for the School of Veterinary Science, which was to be the first professional faculty of the new university. It was decided that the new university would be named after Murdoch, a prominent local author, philosopher, and an Emeritus Professor at the University of Western Australia. When asked if he minded a new university in Western Australia being named in his honour, he was quoted as saying, "No, but it had better be a good one."

Murdoch University was formally constituted on 25 July 1973. It was opened with an inauguration ceremony on 17 September 1974. This date was chosen as it was Murdoch's 100th birthday. The Governor-General of Australia, John Kerr, attended the ceremony as the guest of honour. Lectures began in 1975, with 510 students initially enrolled for undergraduate programs. At the time, the young university was notable for its admissions policy of taking into consideration eligibility factors other than the school leaving exam results of students. Other universities later came to adopt this more holistic perspective of student eligibility for entrance into university education.

In late 2018, the university faced scandal subsequent to an enrolment surge of international students, many said to be "lacking English language and computing skills". In 2019, a Four Corners investigation by the Australian Broadcasting Corporation (ABC) found further deterioration of standards with allegations of foreign students being recruited as "cash cows".

In May 2021, the university unveiled a new brand, replacing the traditional banksia logo with a simplified "MU" logo intended to be "modern and future-focused", as well as signifying the university's commitment to being a "progressive", "free thinking" university.

In 2023 Murdoch University removed all stair lifts from campus premises. This became an international controversy in 2026 after a former student posted a video about it on social media which went viral. The university's response was criticised as inadequate by disabled students.

In October 2026 the Cook Government announced it was developing a business case to merge Murdoch University with Curtin University and the University of Western Australia.

== Campuses and buildings ==
Murdoch University has three Australian campuses: South Street Campus and Rockingham Campus in Perth, and Mandurah Campus.

=== South Street ===
The main campus is at 32.066°S 115.835°E on South Street, Perth, in the suburb of Murdoch, near the Kwinana Freeway. South Street Campus is Australia's geographically largest campus at 2.27 square kilometres (0.88 sq mi), large enough to accommodate the veterinary school and its animal stocks – the only such school in Western Australia. Most of the southern part of the university consists of paddocks of livestock, farms and renewable energy facilities.

The master plan for the campus included an open quadrangle of grass and trees, known as Bush Court, in the northern part of Murdoch campus, which rises to the highest altitude on campus. The library and first academic buildings flanking this court were designed by R. J. Ferguson, who also designed several buildings on the University of Western Australia campus. According to the foundation ethos of Murdoch University, there were to be no imposing buildings like the University of Western Australia's grand, Mediterranean-style Winthrop Hall, with its imposing clock tower. Rather, the architecture adopts a low-slung form redolent of a homestead, with covered walkways suggesting a hybrid veranda or cloister around the bush court. In the smaller courtyards exotic gardens, including a Chinese garden of rocks and stones, contrast with the bush court. The planting and landscaping were the work of Marion Blackwell.

Features of the campus include the Joglo Rahayu ('peace pavilion'), a semi-enclosed pavilion near the Education and Humanities building. A monument to the ongoing association between Murdoch University and Indonesian academic institutions in Java, it acts as storage for the Western Australian Gamelan Orchestra.

The university recently established three "myMurdoch Advice" locations across campus, to assist with academic support, general advice about study, wellbeing and specialist advice for international students. A newly renovated Student Hub is located off Bush Court, including a variety of food chains and seating. The university also has a tavern and a restaurant named Sir Walter's. A range of food trucks are also available via the Pop-Up Ref on the east side of the campus.

Images of South Street Campus
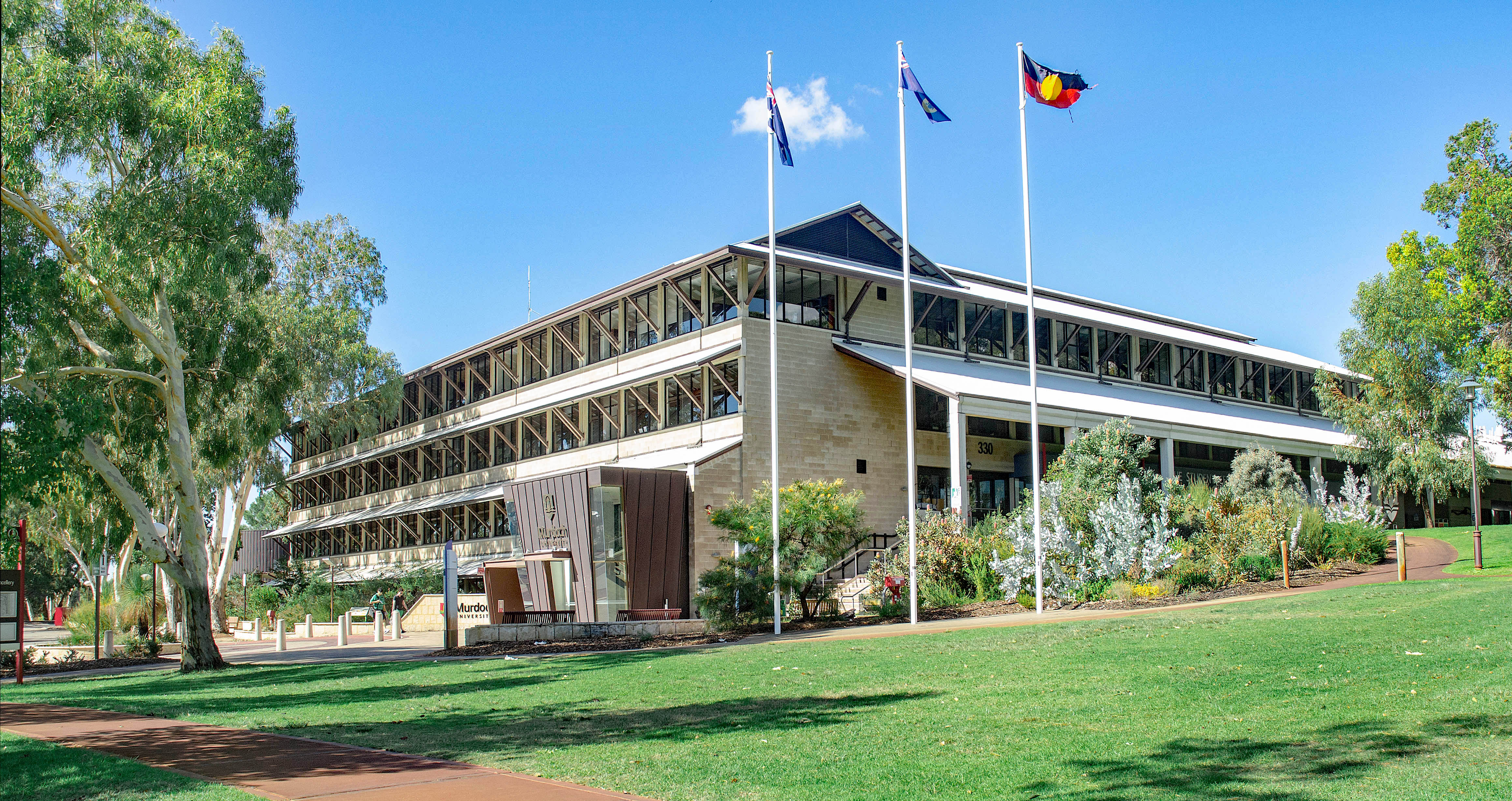
Chancellery building

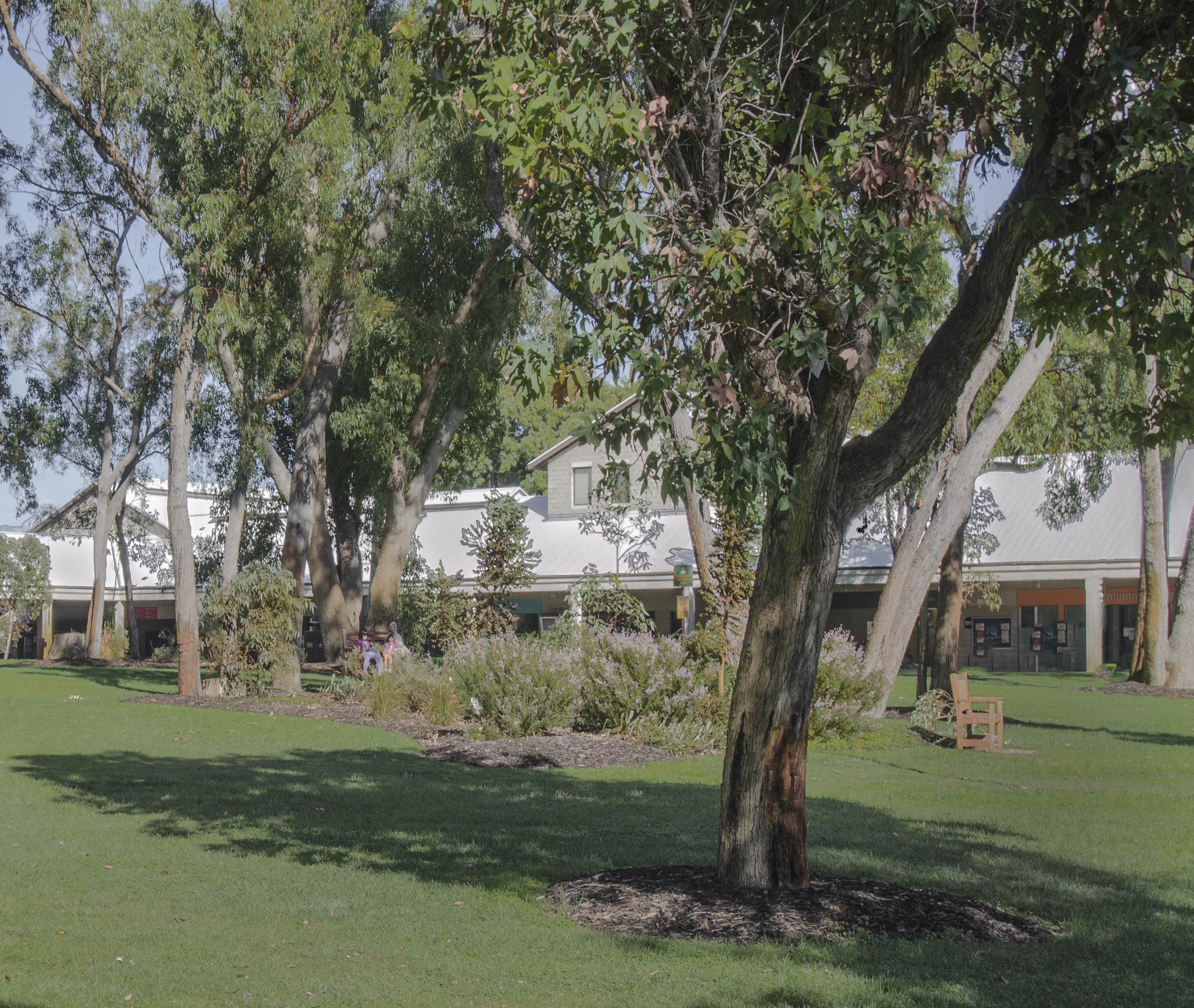
Bush Court and original campus buildings

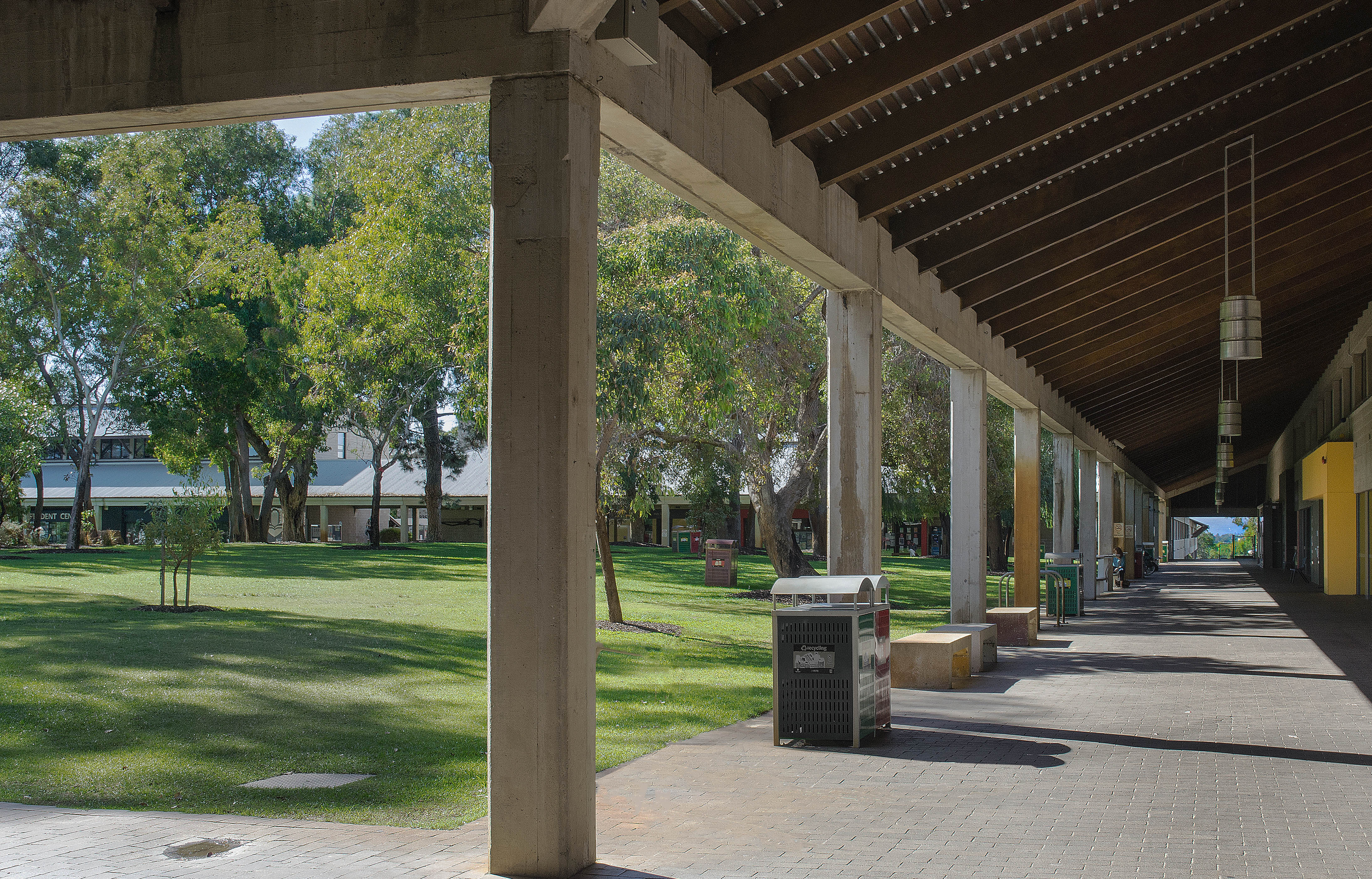
View of Bush Court from Broadwalk

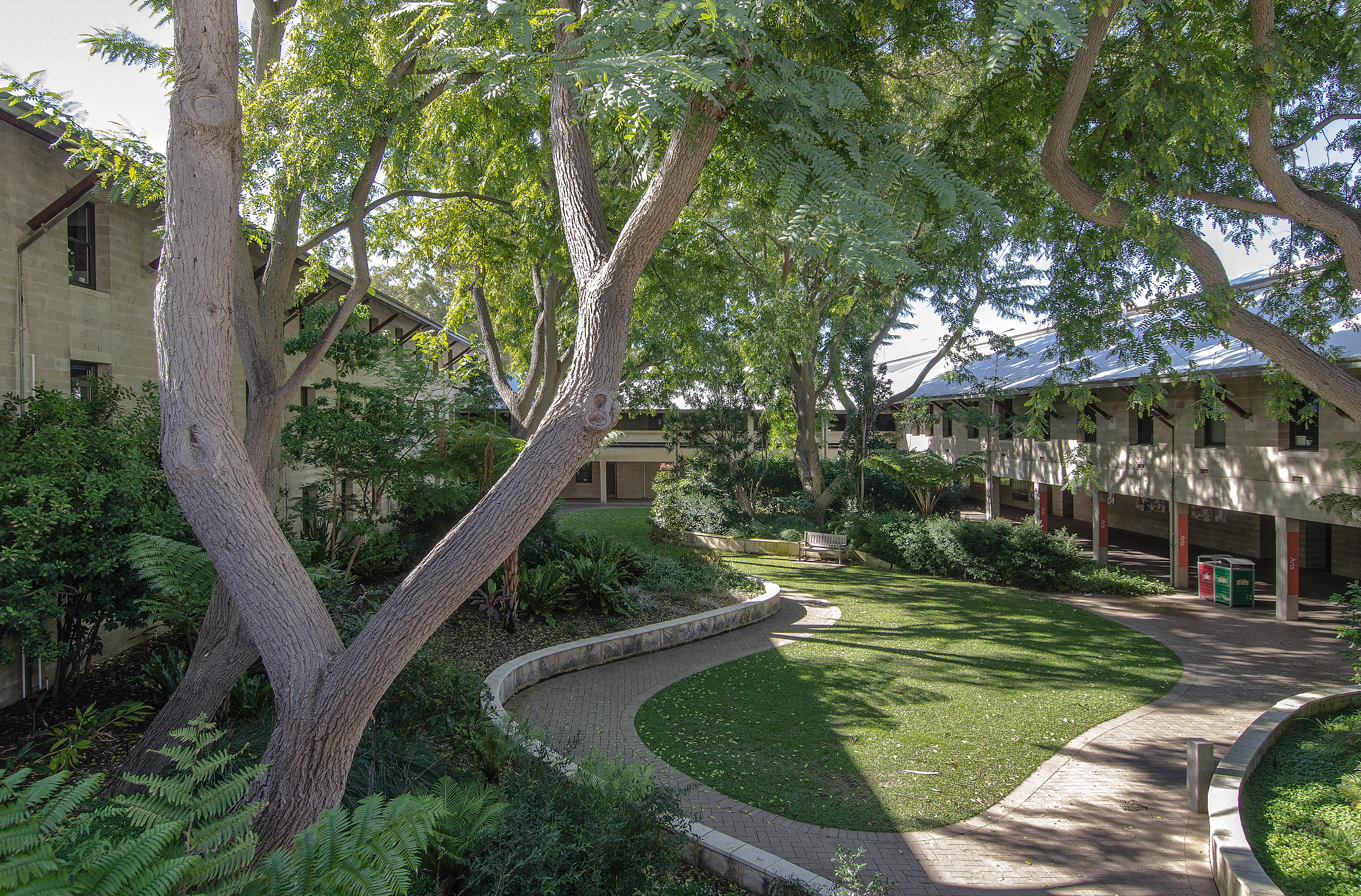
Bower Court in the Social Sciences building

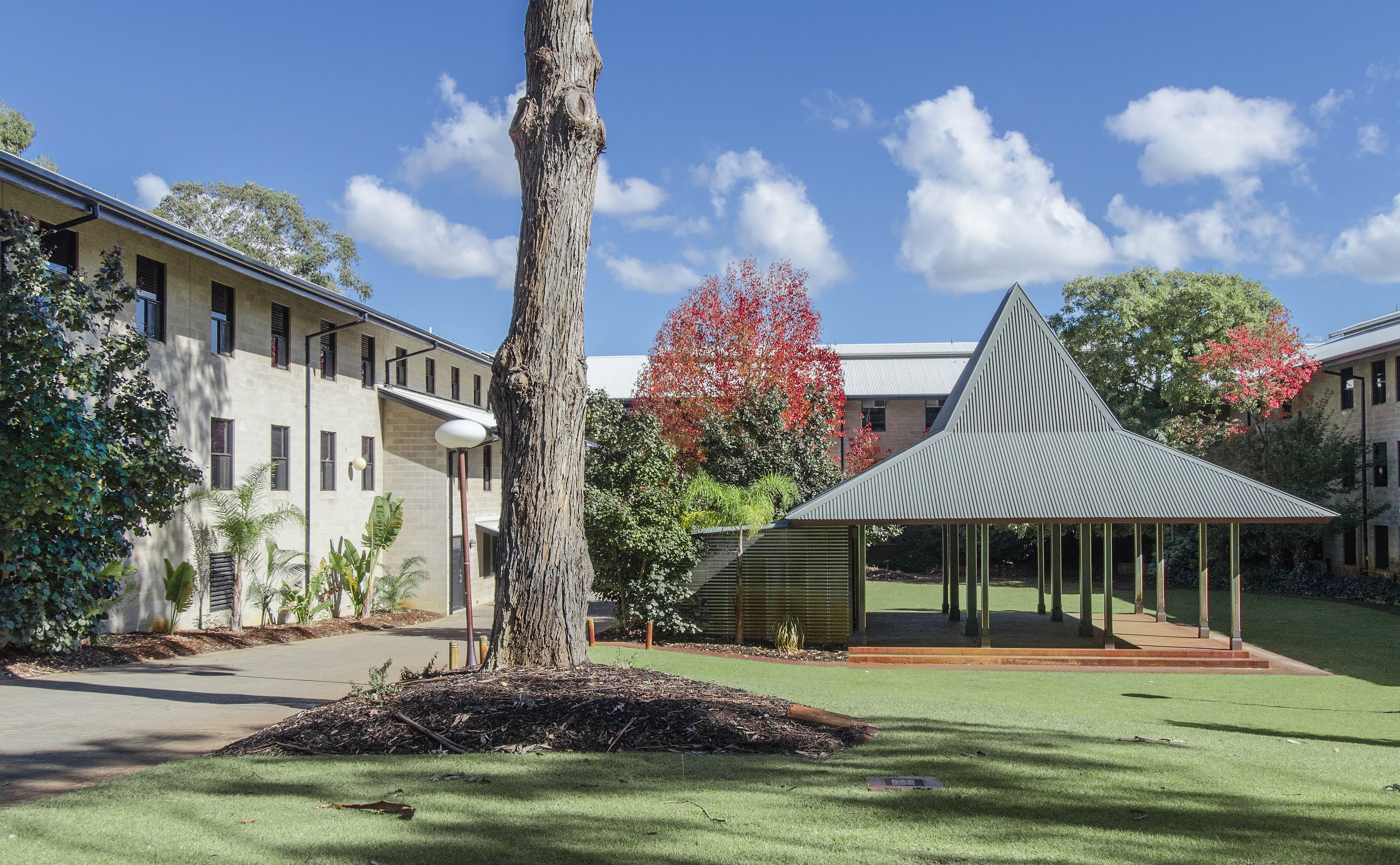
Joglo Rahayu ('peace pavilion')

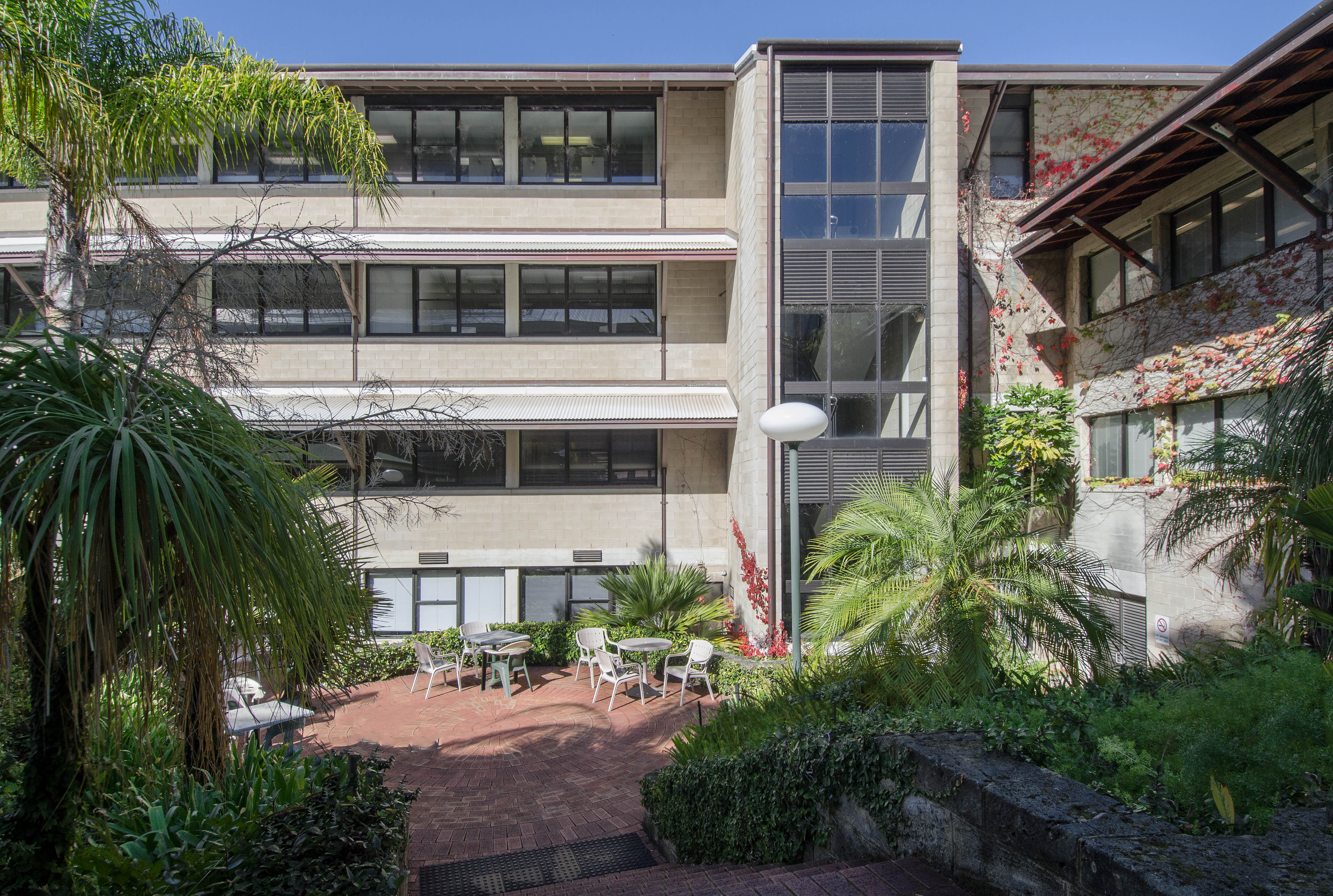
Economics and commerce Building

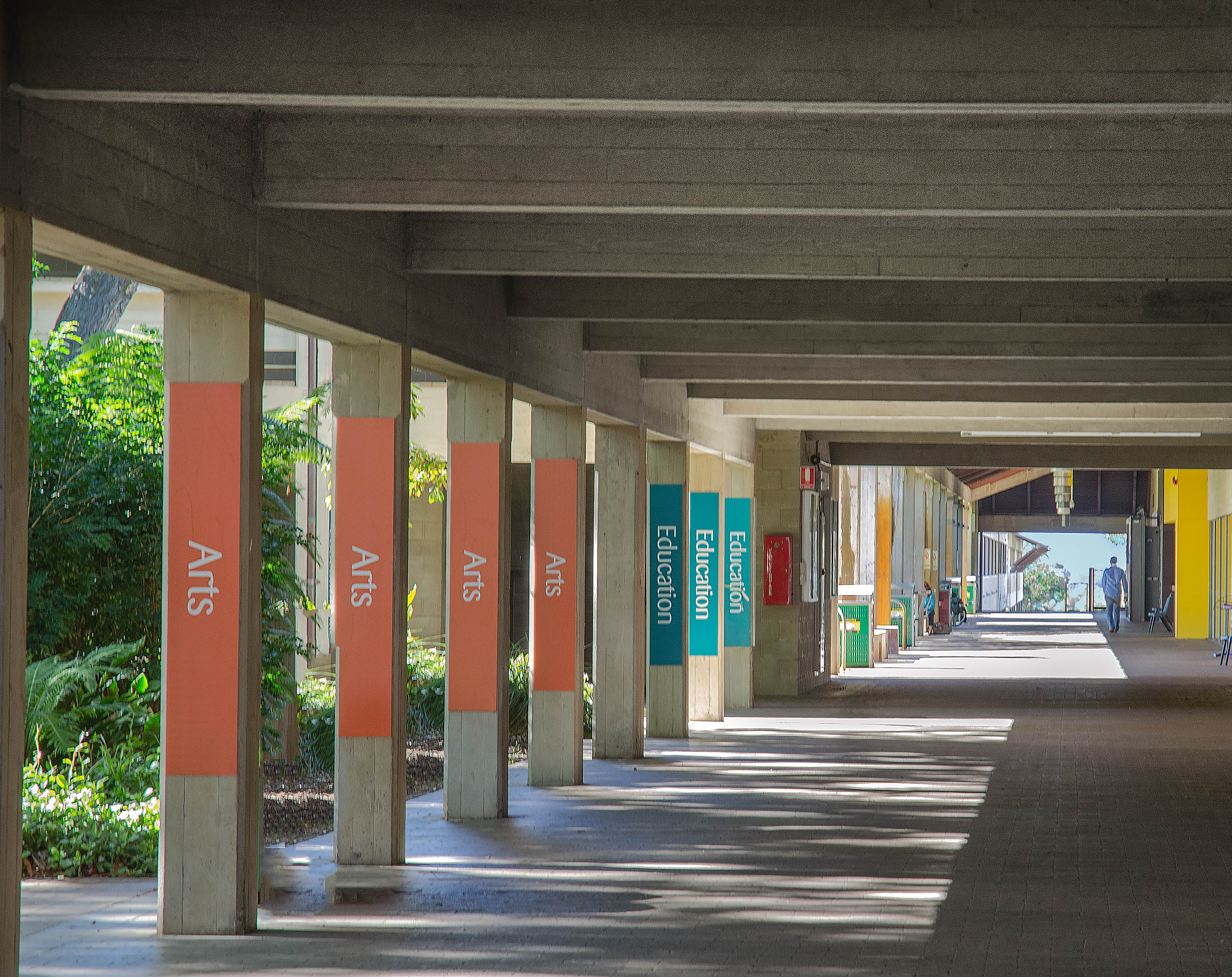
Broadwalk, west

=== Rockingham Campus ===
The Rockingham Campus is located at 32.278°S 115.751°E, 38 kilometres (24 mi) south of central Perth in the suburb of Rockingham. Opened in 1996, it is co-located with Rockingham Challenger Institute of Technology campus, and features an arts and commerce building. The campus ceased offering undergraduate classes at the end of 2014 because not enough students attended the campus.

==== Rockingham Regional Campus Community Library ====
Rockingham Regional Campus Community Library, located at the Rockingham Campus, is a joint venture between the university, the City of Rockingham and Challenger Institute of Technology. Members of all of these groups have free access to library membership.

Membership entitles all patrons to access to Challenger Institute of Technology, university and public library resources at Rockingham.

=== Mandurah Campus ===
The Mandurah Campus is located at 32.516°S 115.756°E, 64 kilometres (40 mi) south of central Perth in the suburb of Greenfields, near the regional centre of Mandurah. Opened in 2004, it is home to the School of Health Professions' Bachelor of Nursing (formally Nursing and Midwifery). In Semester 2, 2015, this degree also became available for study at the South Street Campus. Murdoch University shares the campus with Challenger Institute and John Tonkin College (formerly Mandurah Senior College).

=== Murdoch University Dubai ===
Murdoch University Dubai is a branch campus, established in 2008 in Dubai International Academic City to cater for the expanding Dubai media and financial sectors, and support Dubai's ambitions in providing an ongoing reserve of regional graduates connected to the demands of the region's booming industries.

The campus in Dubai offers degree programs in Commerce, Information Technology and Media and postgraduate programs in Business, Human Resource Management and Education. The Degree programs are fully compatible with those offered in Perth and carry full Australian accreditation as well as being certified by the Knowledge and Human Development Authority, Government of Dubai.

=== Murdoch University International Study Centre Singapore ===
The Murdoch University International Study Centre (MUISC) in Singapore was officially opened in June 2008 by Australian High Commissioner Miles Kupa.

== Governance and structure ==
=== Constituent schools ===
There are sixteen schools at Murdoch University:

- School of Agricultural Sciences
- School of Allied Health
- Murdoch Business School
- School of Education
- School of Engineering and Energy
- School of Environmental and Conservation Sciences
- School of Humanities, Arts and Social Sciences
- School of Indigenous Knowledges
- School of Information Technology
- School of Law and Criminology
- School of Mathematics, Statistics, Chemistry and Physics
- School of Media and Communication
- School of Medical, Molecular and Forensic Sciences
- School of Nursing
- School of Psychology
- School of Veterinary Medicine

== Academic profile ==
Murdoch University is a research-intensive institution and a member of Innovative Research Universities Australia (IRU Australia).

According to The Australian, the Graduate Careers Council of Australia found that Murdoch journalism graduates rated satisfaction with their course at a level within the top five nationally.

Murdoch University is the founder of the ACICIS (Australian Consortium for 'In-Country' Indonesian Studies) Study Indonesia program, a non-profit consortium of Australian universities that was established in 1994 to coordinate semester-long study programs at partner universities in Yogyakarta and Malang in Indonesia, for Australian university students.

The Theology programme at Murdoch was, until its controversial closure in 2021, the most integrated of any Australian public university and included a full complement of staff working on-site.

The university is one of the partners in the Western Australian Pregnancy Cohort (Raine) Study, one of the largest cohorts of pregnancy, childhood, adolescence and early adulthood to be carried out anywhere in the world.

The Australian National Phenome Centre (ANPC), led by Murdoch University, is a world-leading research institute in metabolic phenotyping, as well as the only facility of its kind in the southern hemisphere. The ANPC is led by Professor Jeremy K. Nicholson, one of the most renowned academic in the areas of metabolomics. During the COVID-19 pandemic, researchers at Murdoch University were at the forefront of studying the long-term biochemistry and symptomatology of the coronavirus, including the discovery of distinct blood signatures of patients who contracted the virus.

The university's work with conservation management has including the protection of dugongs through drone-tracking devices, and the use of space technology to track movement patterns of vulnerable whale sharks. Murdoch researchers also work to protect the endangered native black cockatoos.

Murdoch was the subject of an ABC Four Corners report on selling of placements and the associated student visas to seemingly unqualified people including those who had been previously rejected for Australian visas. Subsequently, the Department of Home Affairs increased Murdoch's risk rating.

=== Asia Research Centre and Indo-Pacific Research Centre ===
The Asia Research Centre, founded in 1991, produced multi-disciplinary research in politics, political economy, modes of governance, social change, and policy making. Its distinctive contribution to the research debate is based on the proposition that these factors have their roots in broader processes of conflict and change in society that are connected to the advance of market economies. The centre encompasses researchers from across Murdoch University. It also regularly engages in collaboration with researchers from other universities around the world.

In 2022, Murdoch University launched the Indo-Pacific Research Centre as the successor of the Asia Research Centre. The new centre facilitates innovative and policy-relevant research on security, conflict, development, and the environment in the Indo-Pacific region. As of 2024, Professor Jacqueline Lo is the director of the Indo-Pacific Research Centre.

=== Academic reputation ===
University rankings

Global – Overall
- ARWU World: 501–600 (2025)
- CWTS World: 841 (Note: The CWTS Leiden Ranking is based on P (top 10%).) (2024)
- QS World: =423 (2026)
- THE World: 401–500 (2026)
- USNWR Global: =510 (25/26)

National – Overall
- ARWU National: 25 (2025)
- CWTS National: 27 (2024)
- ERA National: 25 (2018)
- QS National: 24 (2026)
- THE National: 26–32 (2026)
- USNWR National: 27 (25/26)
- AFR National: =26 (2025)

In the 2024 Aggregate Ranking of Top Universities, which measures aggregate performance across the QS, THE and ARWU rankings, the university attained a position of #367 (25th nationally).

National publications

In the Australian Financial Review Best Universities Ranking 2025, the university was tied #26 amongst Australian universities.

Global publications

In the 2026 Quacquarelli Symonds World University Rankings (published 2025), the university attained a tied position of #423 (24th nationally).

In the Times Higher Education World University Rankings 2026 (published 2025), the university attained a tied position of #401-500 (tied 26-32nd nationally).

In the 2025 Academic Ranking of World Universities, the university attained a position of #501–600 (25th nationally).

In the 2025–2026 U.S. News & World Report Best Global Universities, the university attained a tied position of #510 (27th nationally).

In the CWTS Leiden Ranking 2024, the university attained a position of #841 (27th nationally).

=== Student outcomes ===
The Australian Government's QILT (Note: Abbreviation for Quality Indicators for Learning and Teaching.) conducts national surveys documenting the student life cycle from enrolment through to employment. These surveys place more emphasis on criteria such as student experience, graduate outcomes and employer satisfaction than perceived reputation, research output and citation counts.

In the 2023 Employer Satisfaction Survey, graduates of the university had an overall employer satisfaction rate of 74.3%.

In the 2023 Graduate Outcomes Survey, graduates of the university had a full-time employment rate of 67.7% for undergraduates and 86.9% for postgraduates. The initial full-time salary was A$71,100 for undergraduates and A$98,200 for postgraduates.

In the 2023 Student Experience Survey, undergraduates at the university rated the quality of their entire educational experience at 77.4% meanwhile postgraduates rated their overall education experience at 79.8%.

== Student life ==
=== Student demographics ===
Murdoch University has more than 23,000 registered students, of which 37% are international students.

In November 2008 H.E. Sheikh Nahayan Bin Murbarak Al Nahayan (Minister of Higher Education and Research) opened the Murdoch International Study Centre in Dubai, United Arab Emirates.

== Notable people ==
- Glenn Albrecht – sustainability expert and coined the term solastalgia
- Visam Ali – Maldivian politician
- Cora Baldock – Sociologist, and former President of the Australian Sociological Association
- Adam Bandt – Australian politician, former leader of the Australian Greens
- Sarah Bell – professor of engineering
- Reg Bolton – clown
- Terry Budge – Chancellor of the University 2006–2013
- Jeremy Callaghan – actor
- Wendy Carlin – professor of economics
- Craig Challen – technical diver and cave explorer, veterinary surgeon, and 2019 co-Australian of the Year
- Chen Siqing (in this Chinese name, the family name is Chen) – banker, chairman of the board of the Industrial and Commercial Bank of China, former chairman the board of the Bank of China
- Leonard Collard – Author, Professor of Indigenous studies at University of Western Australia
- Roger Cook – Premier of Western Australia
- Tracey Cross – Australian Paralympic swimmer
- Muredach Dynan – educationist and Pro Vice-Chancellor, Australian Catholic University
- James Edelman – justice of the High Court of Australia and former justice of the Supreme Court of Western Australia and Federal Court of Australia
- Alan Eggleston – Australian politician, former Senator for Western Australia, representing the Liberal Party
- Vivienne Elanta – environmental activist
- Margaret Friedel – Australian rangeland ecology and management researcher
- Brian Greig – Australian politician, former Senator for Western Australia representing the Australian Democrats
- Kevin Hewison – Asian Studies professor
- Frederic Jevons – biochemist and educator
- Michael Keenan – Australian politician, member for Stirling, representing the Liberal Party
- Raeesah Khan – Singaporean activist and politician
- Bill Loader – Emeritus Professor of New Testament
- Scott Ludlam – Former Senator for Western Australia and federal co-leader of the Australian Greens
- Toby Miller – cultural and media studies scholar
- Hannah McGlade – academic, human rights advocate and lawyer
- Jeremy K. Nicholson – academic specialising in metabonomics
- Melissa Parke – Australian politician, member for Fremantle, representing the Labor Party
- Brad Pettitt – Former Mayor of the City of Fremantle, member of the WA Legislative Council, representing the Greens (WA)
- Margaret Quirk – Australian politician in the WA Legislative Assembly, representing the Labor Party
- Chandrika Ravi – Indian-Australian model, dancer and actress
- Kim Scott – author
- Sally Talbot – Australian politician, member of the WA Legislative Council, representing Australian Labor Party (Western Australian Branch)
- Jan Thomas – Vice-chancellor of Massey University, New Zealand
- Andrew Thompson (parasitologist) – Parasitologist and academic
- John Turner – Australian politician representing the Nationals
- Rajeev Kumar Varshney FRS – academic, an internationally renowned agricultural scientist especialising in genomics, pre-breeding, seed system and capacity building
- Kon Vatskalis – Australian politician representing the Labor Party, current Lord Mayor of Darwin
- McKenzie Wark – writer and academic
- Giz Watson – Australian politician, former leader of the Greens WA
- Royston Wee – (Management and Marketing) professional Mixed Martial Artist in the UFC
- Barbara Wienecke – Antarctic researcher, seabird ecologist
- Grant Woodhams – Australian politician representing the Nationals
- Alison Xamon – Australian politician in the Legislative Council, Parliamentary leader of the Greens WA
- Edmund Yeo – Malaysian filmmaker
- Glenn Yong – Singaporean actor & singer
- Basil Zempilas – Broadcaster and Lord Mayor of Perth

== See also ==
- List of universities in Australia
