= Toxin and Toxin-Target Database =

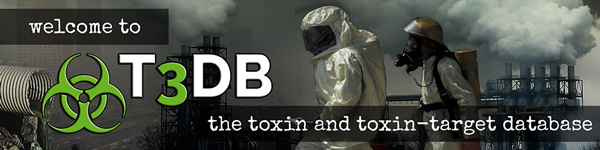

Content
- Description: Toxin and toxin target database
- Data types captured: Small molecule poisons, toxic compounds and toxins, chemical structures, toxic compound descriptions, chemical taxonomy, toxin targets and transporters, target protein sequences, mechanisms of action, lethal doses, chemical properties, nomenclature, synonyms, NMR spectra, MS spectra, gene regulation, concentrations

Contact
- Research center: University of Alberta and The Metabolomics Innovation Centre
- Laboratory: David S. Wishart
- Primary citation: T3DB: the toxic exposome database.
- Release date: 2009

Access
- Website: http://www.t3db.ca
- Download URL: http://www.t3db.ca/downloads

Miscellaneous
- Data release frequency: Every 3-4 years with periodic corrections and updates
- Curation policy: Manually curated

The Toxin and Toxin-Target Database (T3DB), also known as the Toxic Exposome Database, is a freely accessible online database of common substances that are toxic to humans, along with their protein, DNA or organ targets. The database currently houses nearly 3,700 toxic compounds or poisons described by nearly 42,000 synonyms. This list includes various groups of toxins, including common pollutants, pesticides, drugs, food toxins, household and industrial/workplace toxins, cigarette toxins, and uremic toxins. These toxic substances are linked to 2,086 corresponding protein/DNA target records. In total there are 42,433 toxic substance-toxin target associations. Each toxic compound record (ToxCard) in T3DB contains nearly 100 data fields and holds information such as chemical properties and descriptors, mechanisms of action, toxicity or lethal dose values, molecular and cellular interactions, medical (symptom and treatment) information (Fig. 1–3), NMR an MS spectra, and up- and down-regulated genes. This information has been extracted from over 18,000 sources, which include other databases, government documents, books, and scientific literature.

The primary focus of the T3DB is on providing mechanisms of toxicity and identifying target proteins for common toxic substances. While a number of other toxic compound databases do exist, their emphasis is on covering large numbers of chemical compounds that are almost never seen outside a chemical laboratory. T3DB attempts to capture data on only those toxic substances that are abundant or in widespread use and have been detected or measured in humans. T3DB is fully searchable and supports extensive text, sequence, chemical structure, relational query and spectral searches. It is both modelled after and closely linked to the Human Metabolome Database (HMDB) and DrugBank. Potential applications of T3DB include metabolomics and environmental exposure studies, toxic compound metabolism prediction, toxin/drug interaction prediction, and general toxic substance awareness.

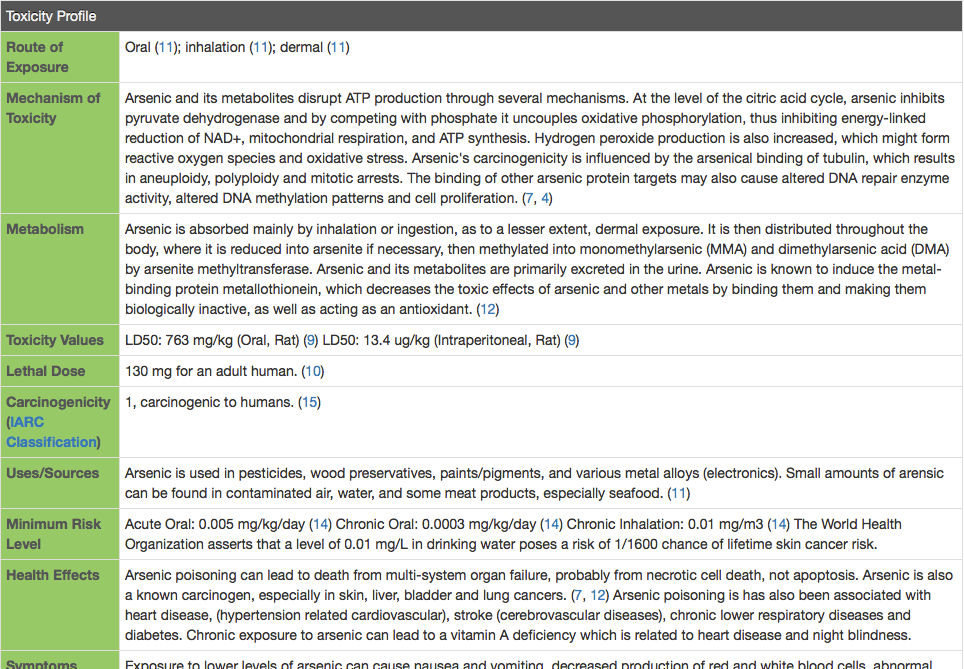
Fig. 1. T3DB Arsenic toxicity

== Scope and access ==
All data in T3DB is non-proprietary or is derived from a non-proprietary source. It is freely accessible and available to anyone. In addition, nearly every data item is fully traceable and explicitly referenced to the original source. T3DB data is available through a public web interface and downloads.

== See also ==
- Poison
- Toxin
- List of extremely hazardous substances
- List of biological databases
- KEGG
- HMDB
- SMPDB
