= Jeremy K. Nicholson =

Biological chemist

Jeremy Kirk Nicholson
- Born: 19 August 1956 (age 70)
- Education: Liverpool University; London University
- Known for: Metabonomics
- Scientific career
- Fields: Biological chemistry
- Workplaces: Birkbeck College, London University; London School of Pharmacy; Imperial College London; Murdoch University
- Website: profiles.murdoch.edu.au/myprofile/jeremy-nicholson/

Jeremy K. Nicholson is a professor and pro vice chancellor of Health Sciences at Murdoch University in Perth, Western Australia, where he leads the Australian National Phenome Centre. He is also an emeritus professor of Biological Chemistry at Imperial College London and was the director and principal investigator of the MRC-NIHR National Phenome Centre until 2018.

== Biography ==
Nicholson obtained his BSc in Marine Biology with honours from Liverpool University in 1977 and his PhD in biochemistry from St Thomas's Hospital Medical School (King's College, London University) in 1980. He has worked at Birkbeck College, London University and at the London School of Pharmacy, becoming full Professor in 1992. In 1998, he became Professor and Head of Biological Chemistry at Imperial College London. Nicholson was appointed Head of the Department of Surgery and Cancer at Imperial College London in 2009. In December 2012, Nicholson became the Director of the MRC-NIHR National Phenome Centre and launched the International Phenome Centre Network (IPCN) in 2016. He was made Emeritus Professor of Biological Chemistry at Imperial College London in 2018. Nicholson moved to Perth, Western Australia in 2018 to take up his role as Pro Vice Chancellor of Health Sciences at Murdoch University.

Nicholson holds honorary professorships at twelve different universities. He also holds multiple professorships at the Chinese Academy of Sciences, of which he was elected as an Albert Einstein Honorary Professor in 2014. Nicholson was recently appointed as a special advisor to the Minister of Health in Western Australia.

Nicholson is the founder director, chief scientist and chief scientist officer at Metabometrix Limited, an Imperial College London spin-off company incorporated in April 2000 and specializing in molecular phenotyping, clinical diagnostics and toxicological screening via metabonomics and metabolomics. He is also a founder and scientific advisor of Melico Sciences Limited incorporated in 2017 and specializing in metabolic life coaching.

== Work ==
Nicholson is known for having been an early pioneer in NMR-based metabonomics, more commonly known as metabolomics or metabolic profiling. His research interests include spectroscopic and chemometric approaches to the investigation of disturbed metabolic processes in complex organisms.

He is an associate editor and frequent contributor to the Journal of Proteome Research (JPR).

== Awards, honorary positions and lectureships ==
Nicholson has received numerous grants and awards for his work, recent awards including:

- 2019 Doctor of Science Honoris causa, The University of Hong Kong
- 2018 Elected Honorary Fellow of the Royal College of Physicians
- 2015 Honorary Professor, University of New South Wales, Sydney, Australia
- 2015 Warren Lecturer, Vanderbilt University, USA
- 2014 Robert E Stowell Lectureship, University of California, Davis, USA
- 2014 Elected Einstein Professor of the Chinese Academy of Sciences
- 2013 Lifetime Honorary Member of the US Society of Toxicology
- 2013 Lifetime Honorary Fellow of the Metabolomics Society
- 2013 Robert Zhong Award in Surgery (Canada)
- 2010 Elected Fellow of the Academy of Medical Sciences
- 2010 Semmelweis-Budapest Prize
- 2010 NIH: Stars in Cancer and Nutrition Distinguished Lecturer
- 2009 Elected Honorary Director of Wuhan Magnetic Resonance Research Centre, Chinese Academy of Sciences, Dalian, China
- 2008 Theophilus Redwood Award of the Royal Society of Chemistry
- 2007 Interdisciplinary Award of the Royal Society of Chemistry for "his contributions to chemical biology, particularly mechanistic insights into disease and toxicity through the development of the field of metabonomics"
- 2007 The Royal Society of Chemistry Theophilus Redwood Lecturer
- 2006 Pfizer Global Chemistry Discipline Prize
- 2006 Honorary Professor of Biological Spectroscopy, State Key Laboratory of Magnetic Resonance and Molecular & Atomic Physics, Chinese Academy of Sciences, Wuhan, China
- 2006 Honorary Director of the Metabonomics Research Centre, Institute of Chemical Physics, Chinese Academy of Sciences, Dalian, China
- 2006 Honorary Professor of Systems Biology, Shanghai University of Traditional Chinese Medicine, China
- 2006 Honorary Professor of Medicine, Zhejiang University, Hongzhou, China
- 2005 Honorary Professor of Chemistry, Tsinghua University, Beijing, China
- 2005 Honorary Professor of Analytical Chemistry, Chinese Academy of Sciences, Dalian, China
- 2005 Honorary Professor of Systems Biology, Shanghai Jiao Tong University, China
- 2003 Silver Medal for Chemical Biology (Royal Society of Chemistry)
- 2002 Pfizer Academic Innovation Award for Chemical and Medicinal Technology
- 1997 21st SAC Gold Medal for Analytical Chemistry (Royal Society of Chemistry)
- 1994 Jubilee Silver Medal of the Chromatographic Society
- 1992 21st Silver Medal for Analytical Science (Royal Society of Chemistry)

== Publications ==
Nicholson has published over 800 scientific papers. He has an H-index of 122 and is an ISI Highly Cited Researcher.
