= Yeast Metabolome Database =

Database for yeast metabolomics

Content
- Description: Metabolomics database
- Data types captured: Yeast metabolite structures, metabolite descriptions, metabolite reactions, metabolite enzymes and transporters, yeast enzyme and transporter sequences, chemical properties, nomenclature, synonyms, chemical taxonomy, metabolite NMR spectra, metabolite GC-MS spectra, metabolite LC-MS spectra

Contact
- Research center: University of Alberta and The Metabolomics Innovation Centre
- Laboratory: David S. Wishart
- Primary citation: The Yeast Metabolome Database.

Access
- Website: http://www.ymdb.ca
- Download URL: http://www.ymdb.ca/downloads

Miscellaneous
- Data release frequency: Every 2–3 years with periodic corrections and updates
- Curation policy: Manually curated

The Yeast Metabolome Database (YMDB) is a comprehensive, high-quality, freely accessible, online database of small molecule metabolites found in or produced by Saccharomyces cerevisiae (Baker’s yeast). The YMDB was designed to facilitate yeast metabolomics research, specifically in the areas of general fermentation as well as wine, beer and fermented food analysis. YMDB supports the identification and characterization of yeast metabolites using NMR spectroscopy, GC-MS spectrometry and Liquid chromatography–mass spectrometry (LC-MS spectrometry). The YMDB contains two kinds of data: 1) chemical data and 2) molecular biology/biochemistry data. The chemical data includes 2027 metabolite structures with detailed metabolite descriptions along with nearly 4000 NMR, GC-MS and LC/MS spectra.

The biochemical data includes 1104 protein (and DNA) sequences and more than 900 biochemical reactions (Fig. 1) that are linked to these metabolite entries. Each metabolite entry in the YMDB contains more than 80 data fields with 2/3 of the information being devoted to chemical data and the other 1/3 devoted to enzymatic or biochemical data. Many data fields are hyperlinked to other databases (KEGG, PubChem, MetaCyc, ChEBI, Protein Data Bank, UniProt, and GenBank) and a variety of structure and pathway viewing applets. The YMDB database supports extensive text, sequence, spectral, chemical structure and relational query searches.

== Scope and access ==
All data in YMDB is non-proprietary or is derived from a non-proprietary source. It is freely accessible and available to anyone. In addition, nearly every data item is fully traceable and explicitly referenced to the original source. YMDB data is available through a public web interface and downloads.

Users may search through the YMDB using a variety of database-specific tools. The simple text query supports general text queries of the textual component of the database. By selecting either metabolites or proteins in the "search for" field it is possible to restrict the search and the returned results to only those data associated with metabolites or with proteins. YMDB’s browse tool generates a tabular synopsis of YMDB's content (Fig. 2). This browser view allows users to casually scroll through the database or re-sort its contents. Clicking on a given MetaboCard button brings up the full data content for the corresponding metabolite (Fig. 3). Under the Search link users will find a number of search options listed in a pull-down menu. The Chem Query option allows users to draw (using MarvinSketch applet or a ChemSketch applet) or to type (SMILES string) a chemical compound and to search the YMDB for chemicals similar or identical to the query compound. The Advanced Search option supports a more sophisticated text search of the text portion of YMDB. The Sequence Search button allows users to conduct BLAST (protein) sequence searches of all sequences contained in YMDB. Both single and multiple sequence (i.e. whole proteome) BLAST queries are supported. YMDB also supports a Data Extractor option that allows specific data fields or combinations of data fields to be searched and/or extracted. Spectral searches of YMDB’s reference compound NMR and MS spectral data are also supported through its MS, MS/MS, GC-MS and NMR Spectra Search links. Users may download YMDB’s complete textual data, chemical structures and sequence data by clicking on the Download button.

== See also ==
- Baker’s yeast
- List of biological databases
- Metabolome
- Metabolomics
- Yeast
- Yeast in winemaking
