= John Seed =

Australian environmentalist

John Seed is an Australian environmentalist and director of the Rainforest Information Centre, which campaigned to save the sub-tropical rainforests of New South Wales. He is also a prominent figure in the deep ecology movement and co-creator of the Council of All Beings, and other re-earthing processes.

Seed, born in 1945, is the elder son of the artist Judy Cassab and chemical engineer John Kampfner, survivors of Hitler's Holocaust.
