= Small Molecule Pathway Database =

Online database of metabolic pathways

SMPDB
Content
- Description: Pathway database
- Data types captured: Small molecule pathways, metabolic pathways, metabolic disease pathways, metabolite signaling pathways, drug action pathways, drug metabolism pathways

Contact
- Research center: University of Alberta and The Metabolomics Innovation Centre
- Laboratory: David S. Wishart
- Primary citation: SMPDB: The Small Molecule Pathway Database.

Access
- Website: https://www.smpdb.ca
- Download URL: https://www.smpdb.ca/downloads

Miscellaneous
- Data release frequency: Every 2-3 years with periodic corrections and updates
- Curation policy: Manually curated

The Small Molecule Pathway Database (SMPDB) is a comprehensive, high-quality, freely accessible, online database containing more than 600 small molecule (i.e. metabolic) pathways found in humans. SMPDB is designed specifically to support pathway elucidation and pathway discovery in metabolomics, transcriptomics, proteomics and systems biology. It is able to do so, in part, by providing colorful, detailed, fully searchable, hyperlinked diagrams of five types of small molecule pathways: 1) general human metabolic pathways; 2) human metabolic disease pathways; 3) human metabolite signaling pathways; 4) drug-action pathways and 5) drug metabolism pathways. SMPDB pathways may be navigated, viewed and zoomed interactively using a Google Maps-like interface. All SMPDB pathways include information on the relevant organs, subcellular compartments, protein cofactors, protein locations, metabolite locations, chemical structures and protein quaternary structures (Fig. 1). Each small molecule in SMPDB is hyperlinked to detailed descriptions contained in the HMDB or DrugBank and each protein or enzyme complex is hyperlinked to UniProt. Additionally, all SMPDB pathways are accompanied with detailed descriptions and references, providing an overview of the pathway, condition or processes depicted in each diagram. Users can browse the SMPDB (Fig. 2) or search its contents by text searching (Fig. 3), sequence searching, or chemical structure searching. More powerful queries are also possible including searching with lists of gene or protein names, drug names, metabolite names, GenBank IDs, Swiss-Prot IDs, Agilent or Affymetrix microarray IDs. These queries will produce lists of matching pathways and highlight the matching molecules on each of the pathway diagrams. Gene, metabolite and protein concentration data can also be visualized through SMPDB's mapping interface.

SMPDB is part of a suite of metabolomics databases that also includes Human Metabolome Database, DrugBank, and the Toxin and Toxin-Target Database (T3DB). While DrugBank includes information on 7000 drugs and >4200 non-redundant drug targets, enzymes, transporters, and carriers, HMDB houses over 40,000 small molecule metabolites found in the human body. The suite is complemented by T3DB with its over 3100 common toxic substances and over 1300 corresponding toxin targets.

== Version History ==
The first version of SMPDB was released on January 1, 2010. This release contained more than 350 image-mapped pathways for small molecule pathways. The viewer interface was limited to scroll-bar image navigation with 3-step (small, medium, large) zooming. The pathways in this first version were limited to 1) human metabolic pathways; 2) human metabolic disease pathways; and 3) human metabolite signaling pathways. The second version of SMPDB was released in 2014. This version contained more than 620 small molecule pathways. The viewer interface was enhanced to include a Google-Map-like interface with click-n-drag image navigation and unlimited, interactive zooming. The pathways in this second version were expanded to include: 1) general human metabolic pathways; 2) human metabolic disease pathways; 3) human metabolite signaling pathways; 4) drug action pathways and 5) drug metabolism pathways.

== See also ==
- KEGG
- HMDB
- DrugBank
- Reactome
- MetaCyc
- List of biological databases
