= XCMS Online =

Bioinformatics software

- Release: 25 April 2012; 14 years ago
- Stable release: 3.7.1
- Platform: Web
- Type: Bioinformatics / Mass spectrometry software
- License: Freemium / commercial software
- Website: xcmsonline.scripps.edu

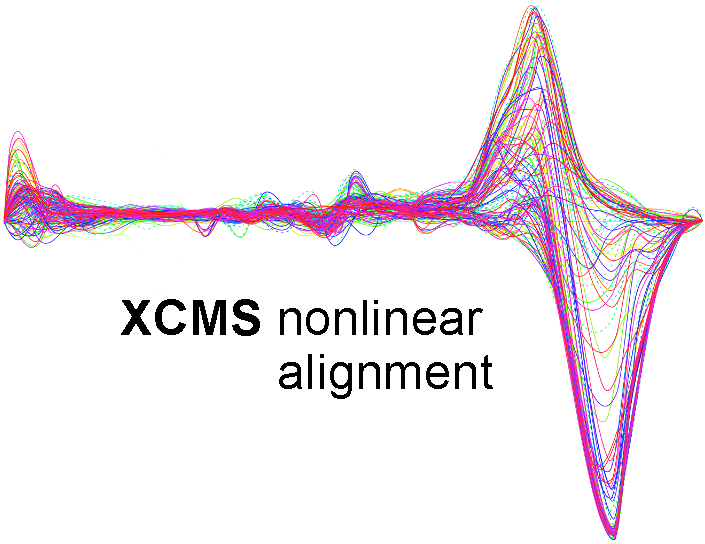
XCMS nonlinear alignment of liquid chromatography mass spectrometry data sets

XCMS Online is a cloud version of the original eXtensible Computational Mass Spectrometry (XCMS) technology (a bioinformatics software designed for statistical analysis of mass spectrometry data), created by the Siuzdak Lab at Scripps Research. XCMS introduced the concept of nonlinear retention time alignment that allowed for the statistical assessment of the detected peaks across LCMS and GCMS datasets. XCMS Online was designed to facilitate XCMS analyses through a cloud portal and as a more straightforward (non command driven) way to analyze, visualize and share untargeted metabolomic data. Further to this, the combination of XCMS and METLIN with 960,000 authentic standards, allows for the identification of known molecules using METLIN's tandem mass spectrometry data, and enables the identification of unknown (uncharacterized molecules) via similarity searching of tandem mass spectrometry data. XCMS Online has also become a systems biology tool for integrating different omic data sets. As of January 2021, the XCMSOnline - METLIN platform has over 44,000 registered users. XCMS - METLIN was recognized in 2023 as the year's top analytical innovation.

XCMS Online works by comparing groups of raw or preprocessed metabolomic data to discover metabolites using methods such as nonlinear retention time alignment and feature detection & matching. Once analysis is complete the data can be viewed several different ways including via bubble plots, heat maps, chromatograms, and box plots. In addition, XCMS Online is integrated with METLIN, a large metabolite database. The following file formats are supported for direct upload to the site.

File Type	Vendor
mzXML	Open Format
mzData	Open Format
.cdf	NetCDF (AIA/ANDI)
.d folders	Agilent, Bruker
.wiff	SCIEX
.RAW folders	Waters
.RAW files	Thermo

== History ==
In 2005, the Siuzdak Lab created an open-source tool named XCMS in the programming language R. Noticing the need for a more accessible, graphical data processing tool they created the cloud-based XCMS Online in 2012. The ability for users to stream data directly from instruments while being acquired was added in 2014. Also in that year a commercial version named XCMS Plus (owned by Mass Consortium Corporation) was released and, in 2015, SCIEX became a reseller. In 2017 it was shown that XCMS Online could be used in a systems biology workflow. One year later, in the absence of a publicly available alternative, a version of XCMS Online and METLIN-MRM was released with the ability to perform multiple reaction monitoring (MRM) and generate MRMs. In 2026, a new version of METLIN-MRM was introduced that enabled a more refined means of generating MRM isotope removal, in-source fragment removal and spline-fitting at multiple collision energies. The accuracy of uMRM was demonstrated on over 300 molecular standards as compared to traditional approaches.
