= Hepburn Heights bushland =

Hepburn Heights bushland is the familiar name of a 53-hectare parcel of natural bushland and woodland in the northern suburbs of the city of Perth, Western Australia, a large portion of which was preserved from residential redevelopment after a determined six-year campaign by environmental activists (November 1987 to June 1993). Being an environmentally destructive project of the notorious WA Inc state government, the land clearing and its spectacular resistance by protesters was given extensive media coverage, aiding the preparation of a closely detailed historical account which was published in 2009.

== Location ==
Hepburn Heights is the name used to describe Crown Land Reserve No. 33286, located in the City of Joondalup suburb of Padbury, about 25 kilometres north-west of the Perth city centre. The eventually-resolved conservation area is bounded by Pinnaroo Valley Memorial Park and a water authority reservoir, Reserve No. 32734. The conservation area consists of 20.88 ha of bushland and includes a 10-metre-wide pipeline corridor and a 25-metre-wide vegetated corridor which is subject to possible future use by the water authority. As the result of a Supreme Court ruling, 38 ha of land was conserved overall, an event which prompted the City of Joondalup to initiate an ongoing programme of biodiversity management.

== See also ==
- Environment of Australia
