= DrugBank =

Online database containing information on drugs and drug targets

Content
- Description: Drug database
- Data types captured: Chemical structures, small molecule drugs, biotech drugs, drug targets, drug transporters, drug target sequences, drug target SNPs, drug metabolites, drug descriptions, disease associations, dosage data, food and drug interactions, adverse drug reactions, pharmacology, mechanisms of action, drug metabolism, chemical synthesis, patent and pricing data, chemical properties, nomenclature, synonyms, chemical taxonomy, drug NMR spectra, drug GC-MS spectra, drug LC-MS spectra

Contact
- Research center: University of Alberta and The Metabolomics Innovation Centre, Alberta, Canada
- Laboratory: David S. Wishart
- Primary citation: DrugBank: a comprehensive resource for in silico drug discovery and exploration.

Access
- Website: www.drugbank.com
- Download URL: www.drugbank.ca/downloads

Miscellaneous
- Data release frequency: Every 2 years with monthly corrections and updates
- Curation policy: Manually curated

The DrugBank database is a comprehensive, freely accessible, online database containing information on drugs and drug targets created and maintained by the University of Alberta and The Metabolomics Innovation Centre (TMIC) located in Alberta, Canada. As both a bioinformatics and a cheminformatics resource, DrugBank combines detailed drug (i.e. chemical, pharmacological and pharmaceutical) data with comprehensive drug target (i.e. sequence, structure, and pathway) information. DrugBank has used content from Wikipedia; Wikipedia also often links to Drugbank, posing potential circular reporting issues.

The DrugBank Online website is available to the public as a free-to-access resource. However, use and re-distribution of content from DrugBank Online or the underlying DrugBank Data, in whole or part, and for any purpose requires a license. Academic users can apply for a free license for certain use cases while all other users require a paid license.

The latest release of the database (version 6.0) contains 11,891 drug entries including 4030 FDA-approved small molecule drugs, 1601 FDA-approved biotech (protein/peptide) drugs, 134 nutraceuticals and 6722 experimental drugs. Additionally, 4939 non-redundant protein (i.e. drug target/enzyme/transporter/carrier) sequences are linked to these drug entries. Each DrugCard entry contains more than 200 data fields with half of the information being devoted to drug/chemical data and the other half devoted to drug target or protein data.

Four additional databases, HMDB, T3DB, SMPDB and FooDB are also part of a general suite of metabolomic/cheminformatic databases. HMDB contains equivalent information on more than 40,000 human metabolites, T3DB contains information on 3100 common toxins and environmental pollutants, SMPDB contains pathway diagrams for nearly 700 human metabolic pathways and disease pathways, while FooDB contains equivalent information on ~28,000 food components and food additives.

== Version history ==
The first version of DrugBank was released in 2006. This early release contained relatively modest information about 841 FDA-approved small molecule drugs and 113 biotech drugs. It also included information on 2133 drug targets. The second version of DrugBank was released in 2009. This greatly expanded and improved version of the database included 1344 approved small molecule drugs and 123 biotech drugs as well as 3037 unique drug targets. Version 2.0 also included, for the first time, withdrawn drugs and illicit drugs, extensive food-drug and drug-drug interactions as well as ADMET (absorption, distribution, metabolism, excretion and toxicity) parameters. Version 3.0 was released in 2011. This version contained 1424 approved small molecule drugs and 132 biotech drugs as well as >4000 unique drug targets. Version 3.0 also included drug transporter data, drug pathway data, drug pricing, patent and manufacturing data as well as data on >5000 experimental drugs. Version 4.0 was released in 2014. This version included 1558 FDA-approved small molecule drugs, 155 biotech drugs and 4200 unique drug targets. Version 4.0 also incorporated extensive information on drug metabolites (structures and reactions), drug taxonomy, drug spectra, drug binding constants and drug synthesis information. Version 5.0 was released in 2018. This version included 2100 FDA-approved small molecule drugs, 555 biotech drugs, 4563 unique drug targets. Version 5 also incorporated new data types that captures the influence of drugs on metabolite (pharmaco-metabolomic), protein (pharmaco-proteomic) and gene expression (pharmaco-transcriptomic) levels. Version 5 also added mobile device compatibility, better searching tools, data on clinical trials and drug repurposing efforts and for the first time, images of pills or medication. Version 6.0 was released n 2024. In addition to the number of drug entries reported above, the number of FDA-approved drugs and investigational drugs had grown compared to Version 5. There was a large increase in the number drug-drug and drug-food interactions reported. The number of drug metabolism pathways grew substantially from 64 in Version 5 to 2721 with this last release. Experimental as well as predicted MS/MS, NMR spectra, Collision Cross Section (CCS- for MS), retention indices (RI, for gas chromatography) and retention time (RT, for liquid chromatography) were added for the small molecule drugs. Table 1 provides a more complete statistical summary of the history of DrugBank's development.

Table 1. Comparison between the coverage in DrugBank 1.0, 2.0, 3.0, 4.0, 5.0 and DrugBank 6.0.
| Category | 1.0 | 2.0 | 3.0 | 4.0 | 5.0 | 6.0 |
|---|---|---|---|---|---|---|
| No. of data fields per DrugCard | 88 | 108 | 148 | 208 | 215 | − |
| No. of search types | 8 | 12 | 16 | 18 | 20 | 23 |
| No. of illustrated drug-action pathways | 0 | 0 | 168 | 232 | 319 | 404 |
| No. of drugs with metabolizing enzyme data | 0 | 0 | 762 | 1,037 | 3,859 | − |
| No. of drug metabolites with structures | 0 | 0 | 0 | 1,239 | 1,360 | 3,037 |
| No. of drug-metabolism reactions | 0 | 0 | 0 | 1,308 | 1,530 | 3,703 |
| No. of illustrated drug metabolism pathways | 0 | 0 | 0 | 53 | 64 | 2,721 |
| No. of drugs with drug transporter data | 0 | 0 | 516 | 623 | 1,954 | 3,408 |
| No. of drugs with taxonomic classification information | 0 | 0 | 0 | 6,713 | 7,387 | 12,723 |
| No. of SNP-associated drug effects | 0 | 0 | 113 | 201 | 324 | − |
| No. of drugs with patent/pricing/manufacturer data | 0 | 0 | 1,208 | 1,450 | 1,820 | − |
| No. of food–drug interactions | 0 | 714 | 1,039 | 1,180 | 1,195 | 2,475 |
| No. of drug–drug interactions | 0 | 13,242 | 13,795 | 14,150 | 365,984 | 1,413,413 |
| No. of ADMET parameters (Caco-2, LogS) | 0 | 276 | 890 | 6,667 | 6,700 | − |
| No. of QSAR parameters per drug | 5 | 6 | 14 | 23 | 23 | − |
| No. of drugs with drug-target binding constant data | 0 | 0 | 0 | 791 | 1,563 | − |
| No. of drugs with NMR spectra | 0 | 0 | 0 | 306 | 922 | 1,822 |
| No. of drugs with MS spectra | 0 | 0 | 0 | 384 | 2,521 | 2,888 |
| No. of drugs with chemical synthesis information | 0 | 38 | 38 | 1,285 | 1,584 | − |
| No. of FDA-approved small molecule drugs | 841 | 1,344 | 1,424 | 1,558 | 2,110 | 2,751 |
| No. of biotech drugs | 113 | 123 | 132 | 155 | 555 | 1,601 |
| No. of nutraceutical drugs | 61 | 69 | 82 | 87 | 97 | 134 |
| No. of withdrawn drugs | 0 | 57 | 68 | 78 | 209 | 317 |
| No. of illicit drugs | 0 | 188 | 189 | 190 | 202 | 205 |
| No. of experimental drugs | 2,894 | 3,116 | 5,210 | 6,009 | 4,964 | 6,722 |
| Total No. of experimental and FDA small molecule drugs | 3,796 | 4,774 | 6,684 | 7,561 | − | − |
| Total No. of experimental and FDA drugs (all types) | 3,909 | 4,897 | 6,816 | 7,713 | − | − |
| No. of all drug targets (unique) | 2,133 | 3,037 | 4,326 | 4,115 | 4,563 | 4,939 |
| No. of approved-drug enzymes/carriers (unique) | 0 | 0 | 164 | 245 | 479 | 526 |
| No. of all drug enzymes/carriers (unique) | 0 | 0 | 169 | 253 | 497 | 526 |
| No. of external database links | 12 | 18 | 31 | 33 | 35 | − |
| No. of drug product pill images | 0 | 0 | 0 | 0 | 3,600 | − |
| No. of linked drug indicators | 0 | 0 | 0 | 0 | 3,024 | 3,820 |
| No. of clinical trials | 0 | 0 | 0 | 0 | 245,356 | 464,870 |

== Scope and access ==
All data in DrugBank is derived from public non-proprietary sources. Nearly every data item is fully traceable and explicitly referenced to the original source. DrugBank data is available through a public web interface.

== See also ==
- ChEMBL
- Drug metabolism
- HMDB
- KEGG
- List of biological databases
- Pharmacology
- SMPDB
- T3DB
- Therapeutic Targets Database
