= METLIN =

Repository of experimental tandem mass spectrometry data

METLIN Database
Content
- Description: repository of chemical entity information as well as tandem mass spectrometry data

Contact
- Research center: The Scripps Research Institute
- Laboratory: Siuzdak laboratory at The Scripps Research Institute
- Release date: 2005

Access
- Website: metlin.scripps.edu

The METLIN Metabolite and Chemical Entity Database is the largest repository of experimental tandem mass spectrometry and neutral loss data acquired from standards. The tandem mass spectrometry data on over 960,000 molecular standards (as of October, 2025) is provided to facilitate the identification of chemical entities from tandem mass spectrometry experiments. In addition to the identification of known molecules, it is also useful for identifying unknowns using its similarity searching technology. All tandem mass spectrometry data comes from the experimental analysis of standards at multiple collision energies and in both positive and negative ionization modes.

METLIN serves as a data management system to assist in metabolite and chemical entity identification by providing public access to its repository of comprehensive MS/MS and neutral loss data. METLIN's annotated list of molecular standards include metabolites and other chemical entities, searching METLIN can be done based on a molecule's tandem mass spectrometry data, neutral loss masses, precursor mass, chemical formula, and structure within the METLIN website. Each molecule is linked to outside resources such as the Kyoto Encyclopedia of Genes and Genomes (KEGG) for further reference and inquiry. The METLIN database was developed and is maintained solely by the Siuzdak laboratory at The Scripps Research Institute.

== Constantly evolving ==
Since its initial implementation in the early 2000s, the freely available METLIN website has collected comments and suggestions for improvements from users in the biotechnology, pharmaceutical and academic communities ultimately resulting in functionally useful technology for metabolomics as well as hundreds of thousands of other molecular entities. The METLIN interface allows researchers to readily search the database and characterize metabolites and other compounds through features such as accurate mass, single and multiple fragment searching, neutral loss and full spectrum search capabilities. The similarity searching feature introduced in 2008 was designed to expedite the identification process of unknown molecules.

Also, METLIN has been used to create a novel multiple reaction monitoring (MRM) library of precursor to fragment ion transitions. The METLIN-MRM transition repository for small-molecule quantitative tandem mass spectrometry was designed to facilitate data sharing across different instruments and laboratories. A new version of generating MRM transitions was introduced in 2026 as uMRM , and takes advantage of the original METLIN-MRM concepts. uMRM however is designed to remove isotopes and in-source fragments (ISF) prior to generating MRMs using a spline-fitting method using multiple collision energies.

The METLIN database is implemented in the cloud to enable users throughout the world. In addition to expanding the tandem mass spectrometry database, METLIN is designed to search tandem mass spectrometry data, precursor mass, chemical formulas, compound names among other search capabilities. METLIN has also been implemented with cognitive computing applications. The tandem MS high-resolution ESI-QTOF MS/MS data on now over 960,000 distinct chemical entities, includes mass spectral collision-induced dissociation data at four different collision energies, in both positive and negative ionization modes.
