= Human Metabolome Database =

Database of human metabolites

Content
- Description: Metabolomics database
- Data types captured: Human metabolite structures, metabolite descriptions, metabolite reactions, metabolite enzymes and transporters, human enzyme and transporter sequences, human metabolic pathways, normal and abnormal metabolite concentrations in humans, associated diseases, chemical properties, nomenclature, synonyms, chemical taxonomy, metabolite NMR spectra, metabolite GC-MS spectra, metabolite LC-MS spectra

Contact
- Research center: University of Alberta and The Metabolomics Innovation Centre
- Laboratory: David S. Wishart
- Primary citation: HMDB: the Human Metabolome Database.

Access
- Website: http://www.hmdb.ca
- Download URL: http://www.hmdb.ca/downloads

Miscellaneous
- Data release frequency: Every 2 years with monthly corrections and updates
- Curation policy: Manually curated

The Human Metabolome Database (HMDB) is a comprehensive online database of small molecule metabolites found in the human body. It has been created by the Human Metabolome Project funded by Genome Canada and is one of the first dedicated metabolomics databases. The HMDB facilitates human metabolomics research, including the identification and characterization of human metabolites using NMR spectroscopy, GC-MS spectrometry and LC/MS spectrometry. To aid in this discovery process, the HMDB contains three kinds of data: 1) chemical data, 2) clinical data, and 3) molecular biology/biochemistry data (Fig. 1–3). The chemical data includes 41,514 metabolite structures with detailed descriptions along with nearly 10,000 NMR, GC-MS and LC/MS spectra.

The clinical data includes information on >10,000 metabolite-biofluid concentrations and metabolite concentration information on more than 600 different human diseases. The biochemical data includes 5,688 protein (and DNA) sequences and more than 5,000 biochemical reactions that are linked to these metabolite entries. Each metabolite entry in the HMDB contains more than 110 data fields with 2/3 of the information being devoted to chemical/clinical data and the other 1/3 devoted to enzymatic or biochemical data. Many data fields are hyperlinked to other databases (KEGG, MetaCyc, PubChem, Protein Data Bank, ChEBI, Swiss-Prot, and GenBank) and a variety of structure and pathway viewing applets. The HMDB database supports extensive text, sequence, spectral, chemical structure and relational query searches. It has been widely used in metabolomics, clinical chemistry, biomarker discovery and general biochemistry education.

Four additional databases, DrugBank, toxin database, SMPDB and FooDB are also part of the HMDB suite of databases. DrugBank contains equivalent information on ~1,600 drug and drug metabolites, T3DB contains information on 3,100 common toxins and environmental pollutants, SMPDB contains pathway diagrams for 700 human metabolic and disease pathways, while FooDB contains equivalent information on ~28,000 food components and food additives.

== Version history ==
The first version of HMDB was released on January 1, 2007, followed by two subsequent versions on January 1, 2009 (version 2.0), August 1, 2009 (version 2.5), September 18, 2012 (version 3.0) and Jan. 1, 2013 (version 3.5), 2017 (version 4.0). 2022 (version 5.0). Details for each of the major HMDB versions (up to version 5.0) is provided in Table 1.

Table 1. Content comparison of HMDB versions
Database Feature or Content Status	HMDB (v1.0)	HMDB (v2.0)	HMDB (v3.0)	HMDB (v4.0)	HMDB (v5.0)
Number of metabolites	2,180	6,408	37,170	114,100	220,945
Number of unique metabolite synonyms	27,700	43,882	152,364	−	−
Number of compounds with disease links	862	1,002	3,948	22,605	22,600
Number of compounds with biofluid or tissue concentration data	883	4,413	6,796	−	−
Number of compounds with chemical synthesis references	220	1,647	8,863	72,604	78,841
Number of compounds with experimental reference ^{1}H and or ^{13}C NMR spectra	385	792	1,054	2,801	12,216
Number of compounds with reference MS/MS spectra	390	799	1,249	1,544	4,064
Number of compounds with reference GC-MS reference data	0	279	884	7,418	11,493
Number of human-specific pathway maps	26	58	442	−	−
Number of compounds in Human Metabolome Library	607	920	1,031	−	−
Number of HMDB data fields	91	102	114	130	130
Number of predicted molecular properties	2	2	10	−	−

== Scope and access ==
All data in HMDB is non-proprietary or is derived from a non-proprietary source. It is freely accessible and available to anyone. In addition, nearly every data item is fully traceable and explicitly referenced to the original source. HMDB data is available through a public web interface and downloads.

== See also ==
- KEGG
- DrugBank
- SMPDB
- MetaCyc
- Bovine Metabolome Database
- Metabolome
- Metabolomics
- List of biological databases
