= Nenad Trinajstić =

Croatian chemist (1936–2021)

Nenad Trinajstić (26 October 1936 – 27 August 2021) was a Croatian chemist and one of pioneers of the chemical graph theory.

== Life and work ==
Trinajstić was born in Zagreb. He received M.Sc. and D.Sc. degrees from the University of Zagreb based on work done at the University of Sheffield under John Murrell. His doctoral advisor was Milan Randić. From 1968 to 1970 he was a Postdoctoral fellow under Michael J. S. Dewar at the University of Texas, Austin with whom he has published 16 papers. He worked at Pliva and Ruđer Bošković Institute eventually becoming a full research professor in 1977 and from 2001 professor emeritus at the University of Zagreb.

His scientific interests are quantum chemistry, mathematical chemistry, chemoinformatics, history of chemistry and philosophy of natural science. He wrote the first monograph on chemical graph theory and introduced several molecular descriptors such as 3-dimensional Wiener index and Zagreb indices (with Ivan Gutman), which are among the more studied topological indices. Independently of Jun-ichi Aihara, he introduced topological resonance energy as a reliable theory of aromaticity. In quantum chemistry he worked on semi-empirical molecular orbital theory and settling conjugated-circuit model on a firm quantum-mechanical basis. Trinajstić has published more than 500 scientific papers, about 150 technical papers and 12 books.

He was a full member of Croatian Academy of Arts and Sciences, a member of International Academy of Mathematical Chemistry and was awarded the Mid–America State Universities Association Distinguished Foreign Scholar Award in 1986 and Croatian National Science Award in 2003.

Trinajstić died on 27 August 2021 at the age of 85.

== Selected publications ==
- A. Graovac; I. Gutman; N. Trinajstić; T. Živković (1972). "Graph theory and molecular orbitals: Application of Sachs theorem". Theor. Chim. Acta. 26 (1): 67–78. doi:10.1007/bf00527654. S2CID 101611868.
- I. Gutman; N. Trinajstić (1972). "Graph theory and molecular orbitals. Total φ-electron energy of alternant hydrocarbons". Chemical Physics Letters. 17 (4): 535–538. Bibcode:1972CPL....17..535G. doi:10.1016/0009-2614(72)85099-1.
- I. Gutman; M. Milun; N. Trinajstić (1975). "Topological Definition of Resonance Energy". MATCH – Commun. Math. Computer Chem. 1: 171–175.
- I. Gutman; B. Ruscic; N. Trinajstić; C.F. Wilcox Jr. (1975). "Graph theory and molecular orbitals. XII. Acyclic polyenes". J. Chem. Phys. 62 (9): 1692–1704. Bibcode:1975JChPh..62.3399G. doi:10.1063/1.430994.
- D. Bonchev; N. Trinajstić (1977). "Information theory, distance matrix, and molecular branching" (PDF). J. Chem. Phys. 67 (10): 4517. Bibcode:1977JChPh..67.4517B. doi:10.1063/1.434593. hdl:10338.dmlcz/104047.
- I. Gutman; M. Milun; N. Trinajstić (1977). "Graph Theory and Molecular Orbitals. XIX. Non–Parametric Resonance Energies of Arbitrary Conjugated Systems". J. Am. Chem. Soc. 99 (6): 1692–1704. doi:10.1021/ja00448a002.
- D. Bonchev; O. V. Mekenyan; N. Trinajstić (1981). "Isomer discrimination by topological information approach". J. Comput. Chem. 2 (2): 127–148. doi:10.1002/jcc.540020202. S2CID 120705298.
- N. Trinajstic. Chemical Graph Theory. Vols. 1,2. CRC Press: Boca Raton, Florida, 1983; 2nd Ed. 1992.
- Z. Mihalić; N. Trinajstić (1992). "A graph-theoretical approach to structure-property relationships". J. Chem. Educ. 69 (9): 701. Bibcode:1992JChEd..69..701M. doi:10.1021/ed069p701.
- D. Plavšić; S. Nikolić; N. Trinajstić; Zlatko Mihalić (1993). "On the Harary index for the characterization of chemical graphs". Journal of Mathematical Chemistry. 12 (1): 235–250. doi:10.1007/BF01164638. S2CID 123346852.
- D. Amić; D. Davidović-Amić; D. Bešlo; N. Trinajstić (2003). "Structure-Radical Scavenging Activity Relationships of Flavonoids". Croatica Chemica Acta. 76 (1): 55–61.
