= Atom-bond connectivity index =

Topological index in chemical graph theory

A graph $G$ with $ABC(G) \approx 4.7861$

The atom-bond connectivity index (ABC index) is a topological index in chemical graph theory that combines information from both vertices (atoms) and edges (bonds) in a molecular graph. It was introduced by Ernesto Estrada, Luis Torres, Lissette Rodriguez, and Ivan Gutman in 1998.

The ABC index differs fundamentally from the connectivity index in that it does not primarily measure molecular branching. This makes it particularly useful for modeling properties that are weakly dependent on branching, such as enthalpy of formation.

== Definition ==
For a graph $G$, the ABC index is defined as:

$$ABC(G) = \sum_{uv \in E(G)} \sqrt{\frac{d(u) + d(v) - 2}{d(u) \cdot d(v)}}$$

where $E(G)$ is the edge set of graph $G$, and $d(u)$ and $d(v)$ denote the degrees of vertices $u$ and $v$.

== Bounds ==
=== Upper bounds ===
For connected graphs with $n$ vertices, $m$ edges, and maximum degree $\Delta$, upper bounds for the ABC index have been established.

For general connected graphs with $n$ vertices, $m$ edges, and maximum degree $\Delta \geq 3$:

$$ABC(G) \leq \sqrt{\frac{\Delta - 1}{\Delta}}\left(2n - m - \frac{2m}{\Delta}\right) + \sqrt{2}\left(m - n + \frac{m}{\Delta}\right)$$

with equality if and only if the graph is bipartite with all edges connecting vertices of degree 1 or 2 to vertices of degree $\Delta$.

Das, Gutman, and Furtula (2012) established an improved upper bound:

$$ABC(G) \leq p\sqrt{1 - \frac{1}{\Delta}} + \sqrt{[M_1 - 2m - p(\delta_1 - 1)](M_2^* - \frac{p}{\Delta})}$$

where:

- $p$ is the number of pendent vertices
- $M_1$ is the first Zagreb index
- $M_2^*$ is the modified second Zagreb index
- $\delta_1$ is the minimal degree of a non-pendent vertex

Equality holds if and only if $G$ is regular, $(1,\Delta)$-semiregular, or bipartite semiregular.

For graphs without pendent vertices:

$$ABC(G) \leq \sqrt{(M_1 - 2m)M_2^*}$$

with equality if and only if $G$ is regular or bipartite semiregular.

For molecular graphs (connected graphs with maximum degree at most 4):

If the graph has maximum degree 3, then:

$$ABC(G) \leq \left(2\sqrt{\frac{2}{3} } - \sqrt{2}\right)n + \frac{4\sqrt{2} - 5\sqrt{\frac{2}{3} }}{3}m$$

If the graph has maximum degree 4, then:

$$ABC(G) \leq (\sqrt{3} - \sqrt{2})n + \frac{5\sqrt{2} - 3\sqrt{3}}{4}m$$

=== Lower bounds ===
For simple connected graphs with $m$ edges and maximal vertex degree $\Delta$:

$$ABC(G) \geq \frac{2^{7/4}m\sqrt{\Delta - 1}}{\Delta^{3/4}(\sqrt{\Delta} + \sqrt{2})}$$

where equality is attained if and only if $G \cong P_n$ (the path graph).

=== Nordhaus-Gaddum type relations ===
For a simple connected graph $G$ of order $n$ with connected complement $\overline{G}$, Das et al. (2012) established a lower bound:

$$ABC(G) + ABC(\overline{G}) \geq \frac{2^{3/4}n(n-1)\sqrt{k-1}}{k^{3/4}(\sqrt{k} + \sqrt{2})}$$

where $k = \max\{\Delta, n - \delta - 1\}$, with $\Delta$ and $\delta$ being the maximal and minimal vertex degrees of $G$. Equality holds if and only if $G \cong P_4$.

For the upper bound:

$$ABC(G) + ABC(\overline{G}) \leq (p + \overline{p})\sqrt{\frac{n-3}{n-2}}\left(1 - \sqrt{\frac{2}{n-2}}\right) + \binom{n}{2}\sqrt{\frac{2}{k} - \frac{2}{k^2}}$$

where $p$ and $\overline{p}$ are the numbers of pendent vertices in $G$ and $\overline{G}$ respectively, and $k = \min\{\delta_1, \overline{\delta_1}\}$. Equality holds if and only if $G \cong P_4$ or $G$ is an $r$-regular graph of order $2r + 1$.

== Extremal graphs ==
=== Trees ===
Among trees with $n$ vertices, the star graph $S_n$ has the maximum ABC index, equal to $\sqrt{(n-2)(n-1)}$.

Among trees with $n$ vertices and $p$ pendent vertices (where $3 \leq p \leq n-2$), the tree with maximum ABC index is obtained from the path graph $P_{n-p+1}$ by attaching $p-1$ pendent vertices to an end-vertex, with ABC index:

$$\frac{n-p}{\sqrt{2}} + (p-1)\sqrt{\frac{p-1}{p}}$$

For chemical trees (trees with maximum degree at most 4) of order $n \geq 11$, the maximum ABC index depends on $n \bmod 4$, with different optimal structures for each residue class.

The problem of finding trees with minimum ABC index (ABC-minimal trees) has been one of the most studied problems in chemical graph theory. Among all graphs of order $n \geq 4$, the graphs attaining the minimum ABC index must be trees. The complete characterization of ABC-minimal trees involves complex structural properties including constraints on vertex degrees and branch configurations.

=== Unicyclic graphs ===
Among unicyclic graphs with $n$ vertices, the graph with maximum ABC index is obtained by adding an edge to the star graph $S_n$, with ABC index:

$$(n-3)\sqrt{\frac{n-2}{n-1}} + \frac{3}{\sqrt{2}}$$

=== Bicyclic graphs ===
Among bicyclic graphs with $n \geq 5$ vertices, the maximum ABC index is achieved by the graph obtained from the star $S_n$ by adding two adjacent edges, with value:

$$(n-4)\sqrt{\frac{n-2}{n-1}} + \sqrt{\frac{n}{3(n-1)}} + 2\sqrt{2}$$

=== Complete graphs ===
Among all graphs of a given order $n \geq 3$, the complete graph $K_n$ attains the maximum ABC index, which equals $n\sqrt{2n-4}/2$.

== Applications ==
The ABC index has been successfully applied in QSPR studies for predicting standard heats of formation of alkanes and energy differences between linear and branched alkanes.

For alkanes, the relationship between the standard heat of formation ($\Delta H_f^\circ$) and the ABC index follows:

$$-\Delta H_f^\circ \,(\mathrm{kJ/mol}) = 65.98 + 20.37 \cdot ABC$$

This model achieved a correlation coefficient of $R = 0.9970$ for a training set of 48 alkanes. A 2012 re-examination confirmed that this simple empirical formula reproduces heats of formation with accuracy comparable to high-level ab initio and DFT quantum chemical calculations (MP2, B3LYP).

The ABC index was also found to explain the stability of branched alkanes, as shown by Estrada in 2008, and provides a good model for the strain energy of cycloalkanes.

More recently, the ABC index and its variants have been applied in QSAR studies for analyzing potential COVID-19 therapeutics. Chaluvaraju and Shaikh (2022) used multiple versions of the ABC index to analyze the molecular structures of drugs including favipiravir, ribavirin, remdesivir, theaflavin, chloroquine, and hydroxychloroquine, correlating these indices with calculated IC50 and EC50 values.

== Variants ==
Several variants of the ABC index have been proposed to explore different structural aspects of molecular graphs or to improve predictive capabilities.

The atom-bond sum-connectivity (ABS) index was introduced by Ali, Furtula, Redžepović, and Gutman in 2022. It is defined as:

$$ABS(G) = \sum_{uv \in E(G)} \sqrt{\frac{d(u) + d(v) - 2}{d(u) + d(v)}} = \sum_{uv \in E(G)} \sqrt{1 - \frac{2}{d(u) + d(v)}}$$

The ABS index combines the structural ideas of the ABC index with those of the sum-connectivity index, using the sum of vertex degrees in the denominator rather than their product.

Despite the algebraic similarity, the mathematical properties of the ABS and ABC indices differ significantly. For example, characterizing trees with minimum ABC index required years of research, whereas the corresponding problem for the ABS index is straightforward; the path graph uniquely attains the minimum ABS index among all trees of a given order.

The general ABS index extends the ABS index by introducing an exponent parameter $\gamma$:

$$ABS_\gamma(G) = \sum_{uv \in E(G)} \left(1 - \frac{2}{d(u) + d(v)}\right)^\gamma$$

When $\gamma = 1/2$, this reduces to the standard ABS index.

The exponential ABC index was introduced by Rada in 2019 as part of a broader framework of exponential vertex-degree-based topological indices designed to enhance discriminative power. It is defined as:

$$e^{ABC}(G) = \sum_{uv \in E(G)} e^{\sqrt{\frac{d(u) + d(v) - 2}{d(u) \cdot d(v)}}}$$

Among trees of order $n$, the star graph maximizes the exponential ABC index.

The Graovac-Ghorbani index (also denoted $ABC_{GG}$) is a distance-based variant introduced by Graovac and Ghorbani in 2010. It is defined as:

$$ABC_{GG}(G) = \sum_{uv \in E(G)} \sqrt{\frac{n_u + n_v - 2}{n_u \cdot n_v}}$$

where $n_u$ denotes the number of vertices closer to vertex $u$ than to vertex $v$, and $n_v$ is defined analogously. Unlike the original ABC index which uses vertex degrees, this variant incorporates distance-based vertex counts. For complete bipartite graphs, $ABC = ABC_{GG}$.

== See also ==
- Topological index
- Randić index
- Zagreb indices
- Chemical graph theory
