= Padmakar–Ivan index =

Concept in chemistry

In chemical graph theory, the Padmakar–Ivan (PI) index is a topological index of a molecule, used in biochemistry. The Padmakar–Ivan index is a generalization introduced by Padmakar V. Khadikar and Iván Gutman of the concept of the Wiener index, introduced by Harry Wiener. The Padmakar–Ivan index of a graph G is the sum over all edges uv of G of number of edges which are not equidistant from u and v. Let G be a graph and e = uv an edge of G. Here $n_{eu}(e\mid G)$ denotes the number of edges lying closer to the vertex u than the vertex v, and $n_{ev}(e\mid G)$ is the number of edges lying closer to the vertex v than the vertex u. The Padmakar–Ivan index of a graph G is defined as

$$\operatorname{PI}(G)=\sum_{e\in E(G)}[n_{eu}(e\mid G) + n_{ev}(e\mid G)]$$

The PI index is very important in the study of quantitative structure–activity relationship for the classification models used in the chemical, biological sciences, engineering, and nanotechnology.

== Examples ==
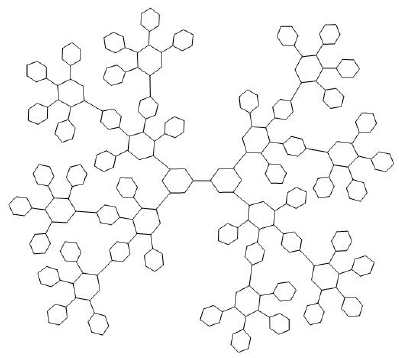

The PI index of Dendrimer Nanostar of the following figure can be calculated by

$$\operatorname{PI}(G_n) = 441\cdot4^n - 639\cdot2^n + 232, \quad n \geq 0.$$

The double graph of a graph $G$, denoted $\mathcal{D}[G]$, has a known index in relation to $G$ itself:

$$\operatorname{PI}(\mathcal{D}[G]) = 8\operatorname{PI}(G)$$
