= Iván Gutman =

Serbian chemist and mathematician (born 1947)

- Born: 1947 (age 78–79); Sombor, Yugoslavia
- Occupation: Mathematician

Iván Gutman (born 2nd. September 1947) is a Serbian chemist and mathematician.

== Life and work ==
Gutman was born in Sombor, Yugoslavia, in a Bunjevac family. In 1970 he graduated chemistry from the University of Belgrade where he worked a short time as an assistant at the chemistry department. From 1971 until 1976 he worked as research assistant and senior research assistant at Ruđer Bošković Institute in Zagreb, department of physical chemistry. In 1973 he received M.Sc. degree from the University of Zagreb, in the area of theoretical organic chemistry. In the same year he received a doctorate degree in chemistry from the University of Zagreb. His supervisor was Nenad Trinajstić. From 1977 he worked at the University of Kragujevac, eventually becoming a full research professor in 1982. In 1981 he received a doctorate degree in mathematics from the University of Belgrade. From 2012 he is a professor emeritus at the University of Kragujevac.

His research interests are theoretical organic chemistry, physical chemistry, mathematical chemistry, graph theory, spectral graph theory and discrete mathematics. Gutman is known for his work in chemical graph theory and topological descriptors. In mathematics he introduced the notion of graph energy, a concept originating from theoretical chemistry. With Chris Godsil he worked on the theory of the matching polynomial.

He is a full member of the Serbian Academy of Arts and Sciences since 1997. Other memberships include membership in the International Academy of Mathematical Chemistry, the Academy of Nonlinear Sciences (Moscow) and Academia Europaea. Gutman is a collaborator on the Lexicon of Danube Croats for Croatian Academic Society 'HAD' in Subotica. He was elected a fellow of the International Core Academy of Sciences and Humanities.

== See also ==
- Graph energy
- Wiener index
- Caterpillar tree
- Szeged index
- Aleksandar Despić
- Pavle Simić
- Milan Vukcevich
- Bogdan Đuričić
- Ljubisav Rakić
- Ivan Gutman
- Sima Lozanić
- Marko Leko
- Mihailo Rašković
- Zivojin Jocic

== Selected publications ==
- A. Graovac; I. Gutman; N. Trinajstić; T. Živković (1972). "Graph theory and molecular orbitals: Application of Sachs theorem". Theor. Chim. Acta. 26 (1): 67–78. doi:10.1007/bf00527654. S2CID 101611868.
- I. Gutman; N. Trinajstić (1972). "Graph theory and molecular orbitals. Total ?-electron energy of alternant hydrocarbons". Chemical Physics Letters. 17 (4): 535–538. Bibcode:1972CPL....17..535G. doi:10.1016/0009-2614(72)85099-1.
- I. Gutman; M. Milun; N. Trinajstić (1975). "Topological Definition of Resonance Energy". MATCH Commun. Math. Computer Chem. 1: 171–175.
- I. Gutman; B. Ruscic; N. Trinajstić; C.F. Wilcox Jr. (1975). "Graph theory and molecular orbitals. XII. Acyclic polyenes". J. Chem. Phys. 62 (9): 1692–1704. Bibcode:1975JChPh..62.3399G. doi:10.1063/1.430994.
- I. Gutman; M. Milun; N. Trinajstić (1977). "Graph Theory and Molecular Orbitals. XIX. Non–Parametric Resonance Energies of Arbitrary Conjugated Systems". J. Am. Chem. Soc. 99 (6): 1692–1704. Bibcode:1977JAChS..99.1692G. doi:10.1021/ja00448a002.
- I. Gutman; O.E. Polansky (1986). Mathematical Concepts in Organic Chemistry. Springer-Verlag.
- I. Gutman (1994). "A formula for the Wiener number of trees and its extension to graphs containing cycles". Graph Theory Notes NY. 27: 9–15.
- I. Gutman (1994). "Selected properties of the Schultz molecular topological index". J. Chem. Inf. Comput. Sci. 34 (5): 1087–1089. doi:10.1021/ci00021a009.
- I. Gutman; B. Zhour (2006). "Laplacian energy of a graph". J. Am. Chem. Soc. 414 (1): 29–37. doi:10.1016/j.laa.2005.09.008.
