= Szeged index =

Topological index of a molecule used in biochemistry

In chemical graph theory, the Szeged index is a topological index of a molecule, used in biochemistry. The Szeged index, introduced by Iván Gutman, generalizes the concept of the Wiener index introduced by Harry Wiener. The Szeged index of a connected graph G is defined as

$$Sz(G)=\sum_{e\in E(G)} n_1(e\mid G)n_2(e\mid G),$$

If e is an edge of G connecting vertices u and v, then we write e = uv or e = vu. For $e=uv\in E(G)$, let $n_1(e\mid G)$ and $n_2(e\mid G)$ be respectively the number of vertices of G lying closer to vertex u than to vertex v and the number of vertices of G lying closer to vertex v than to vertex u.

Szeged index plays an important role in information theory. One way to measure a network structure is through the so-called topological indices. Szeged index has been shown to correlate well with numerous biological and physicochemical properties.

== Examples ==
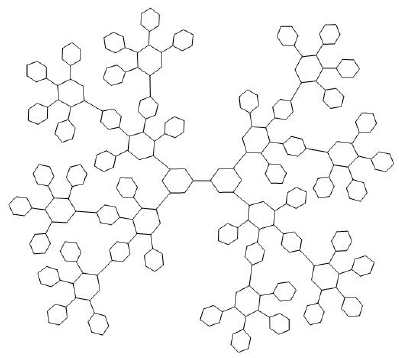

The Szeged index of Dendrimer Nanostar of the following figure can be calculated by

$$Sz(T_n) = 1620n\cdot4^n - 2376\cdot4^n + 2862\cdot2^n-432, \quad n \geq 0.$$

The double graph of a graph $G$, denoted $\mathcal{D}[G]$, has a known index in relation to $G$ itself:

$$Sz(\mathcal{D}[G]) = 16Sz(G)$$
