= Ali Reza Ashrafi =

Iranian mathematician (1964–2023)

- علیرضا اشرفی
- Born: 10 May 1964; Iran
- Died: 9 January 2023 (aged 58); Kashan, Iran
- Education: University of Tehran, Doctoral Computational Group Theory (1994); Shahid Beheshti University MSc Algebra (1990); Kharazmi University, BSc (1988)
- Scientific career
- Fields: Finite groups Mathematical physics Chemical graph theory Mathematical chemistry Computational group theory
- Workplaces: University of Kashan
- Website: ashrafi.kashanu.ac.ir

Ali Reza Ashrafi (10 May 1964 – 9 January 2023) was an Iranian mathematician who worked in computational group theory and mathematical chemistry. Ashrafi was a professor at the department of pure mathematics of the University of Kashan and the vice president of the International Academy of Mathematical Chemistry.

He received his PhD in 1995 from the University of Tehran, with thesis Irreducible character table of the group $\operatorname{Aut}(\operatorname{SL}_5(3))$ written under the direction of Mohammad Reza Darafsheh.

== Death ==
Ashrafi died in a car accident on the way home in Kashan on 9 January 2023.

== See also ==
- Science in Iran
- Intellectual movements in Iran
