= Alexandru Balaban =

Romanian chemist

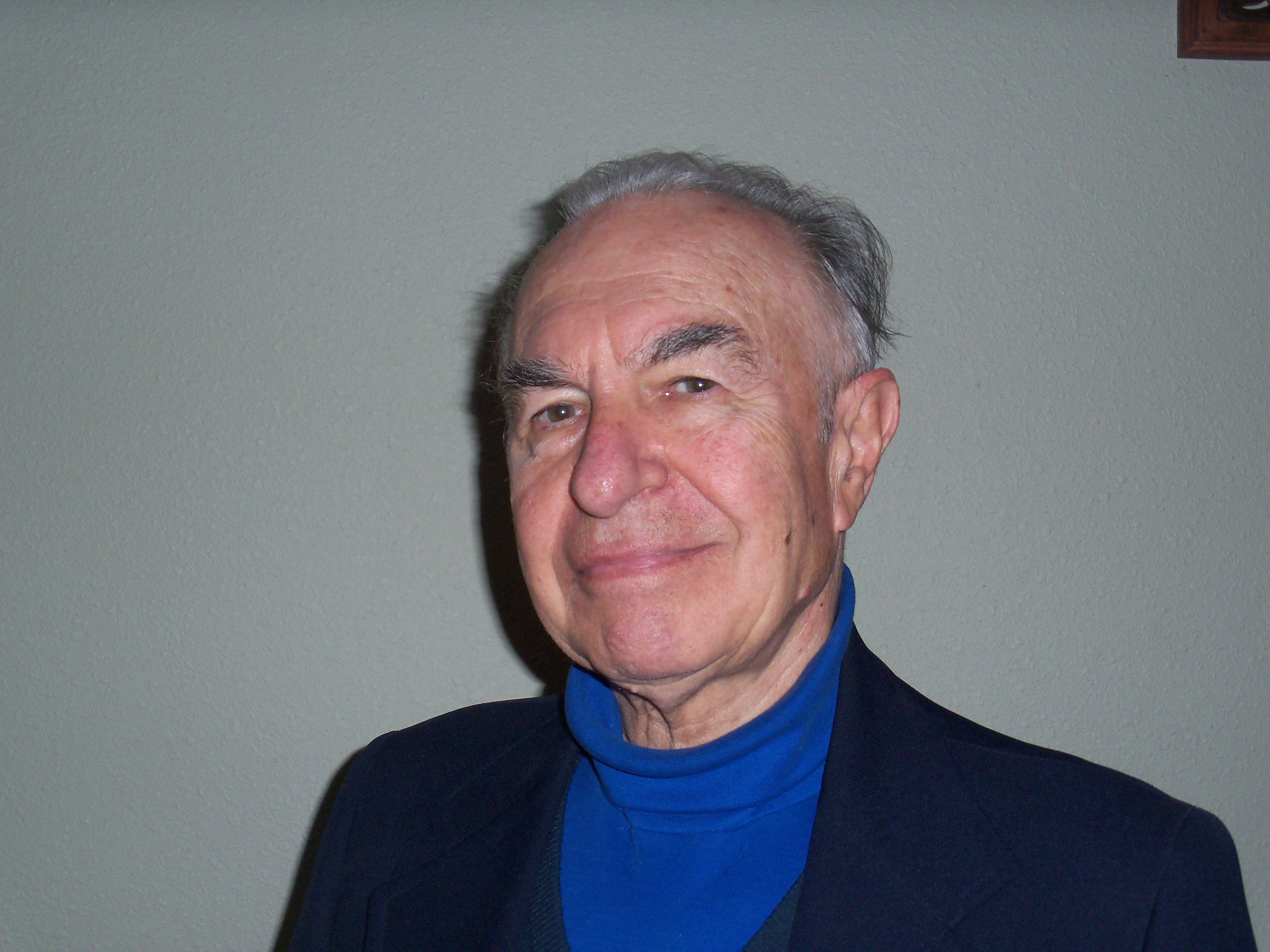
Alexandru T. Balaban in 2010

Alexandru T. Balaban (born April 2, 1931 in Timișoara) is a Romanian chemist who made significant contributions to the fields of organic chemistry, theoretical chemistry, mathematical chemistry, and chemical graph theory.

== Early life and education ==
Balaban was born in Timișoara, in western Romania. His parents, Teodor and Florica, paid a lot of attention to Balaban's education, strongly encouraging his fascination with chemistry. In 1935 his family moved to Bucharest, where he attended elementary school. After World War II, in 1945 they moved to Petroșani, where he finished high school. He enrolled in the Politehnica University of Bucharest in 1949, and received a Ph.D. in chemistry in 1959. His Ph.D. thesis dealt with reactions catalyzed by anhydrous aluminium chloride.

== Career ==
Balaban was a professor of organic chemistry at the Politehnica University of Bucharest: assistant professor (1956–1960), associate professor (1961–1966), and full professor (1970–1999). He was also the head of the Laboratory of Isotopically Labelled Compounds of the Bucharest Institute of Atomic Physics from 1967 to 1974. In 1963, he was elected as Corresponding Member of the Romanian Academy, and in 1990 as Titular Member.

From 1967 to 1970, he was a Senior Research Officer at the Chemistry Division, International Atomic Energy Agency, Vienna, Austria, in charge of radiopharmaceuticals. From 1995 to 1998, he was Vice President of the Romanian Academy. From 1991 to 2012, he was a tenured professor of chemistry at Texas A&M University at Galveston. Since his retirement in 2013, he has been Professor Emeritus.

== Research ==
=== Experimental organic chemistry ===
Balaban investigated the synthesis and properties of pyrylium salts. He discovered a new synthesis of pyrylium salts by diacylation of alkenes, the Balaban-Nenitzescu-Praill reaction. Nowadays, Balaban is recognized as a world authority in this field. He wrote the only book in this area.

Balaban also developed new synthesis of oxazoles by AlCl_{3} catalyzed substitution of aromatic compounds with azlactones, followed by dehydration. In addition, he had been exploring new syntheses of indolizines and of naphthalene derivatives.

In order to explain the extraordinary stability of hydrazyls such as 2,2-diphenyl-1-picryl-hydrazyl, Balaban and his co-workers prepared related hydrazyls with lower steric shielding and accordingly lower stability. Then the first push-pull diarylaminyls were synthesized and shown to have stabilities depending both on electronic and steric effects.

Another experimental research direction involves the synthesis of chelate compounds having boron as the central atom.

=== Theoretical chemistry ===
Balaban had a permanent interest in theoretical chemistry. He is considered as one of pioneers of chemical graph theory. The first book about this interdisciplinary field was edited by Balaban and appeared in 1976: Chemical Applications of Graph Theory.

One area in which cubic (or trivalent) graphs play a dominant role is the enumeration of [n]annulene valence isomers (CH)_{n} where n is an even number. With two coauthors, Balaban published in 1986 on this topic a 3-volume monograph (Annulenes, Benzo-, Hetero-, Homo-Derivatives and Their Valence Isomers). Some of these valence isomers undergo thermal or pohotochemical automerizations. More recently, Balaban edited in 1997 a book titled From Chemical Topology to Three-Dimensional Geometry in which various two- and three-dimensional nets were discussed.

On using an approach similar to that imagined by Randić for his connectivity index χ, but replacing the adjacency matrix by the distance matrix, and compensating graph-size-increase, a new topological index (TI) J was proposed under the name "average distance-based connectivity index"; it is now known as the "Balaban index". Not only is it much less degenerate than all previous TIs, but it allows a simple encoding for the presence of multiple bonds or heteroatoms. Other new TIs were studied: several TIs based on informational descriptors, and triplet-based indices that result from converting matrices into systems of linear equations.

The Lewis acid-catalyzed syntheses of diamondoid hydrocarbons discovered by Schleyer proceed via multiple 1,2-rearrangements. The graph-theoretical analysis of the simplest such reaction involves an ethyl cation with five substituents which undergoes an automerization. This process is characterized by a 20-vertex or a 10-vertex graph depending whether one carbon atom of ethane is or is not labeled. These graphs constitute the first reaction graphs, in which vertices symbolize reaction intermediates and edges symbolize elementary reaction steeps.

=== Graph theory ===
Starting from the 10-vertex graph known as the 5-cage or the Petersen graph, Balaban observed relations among the known cages. Having discovered how a cage with smaller girth g was hidden in a cage with girth g + 1, Balaban published a paper on what was later proved to be the first 10-cage, known as the Balaban 10-cage. In 1973, he found the unique 11-cage, known as the Balaban 11-cage, as was proved by mathematicians using a lengthy computer search.

Proposals made by Balaban about new possibilities for evaluating the performance of researchers, improving the way citations are used for this purpose (e. g., via the Hirsch index) included the use of author indexes of widely circulated treatises, or modifying the way one considers the impact factors of journals.

Honoring invitations to contribute to special issues of journals dedicated to the philosophy of chemistry, Balaban published in Hyle an essay on how the "Sherlock Holmes principle" (if one eliminates the impossible, then whatever remains, no matter how improbable, must contain the truth) can be implemented by chemical graph theory which allows for instance to find all chemical isomers for a given formula.

== Scientific publications ==
He is the author or co-author of 9 books, including:

- Pyrylium Salts. Syntheses, Reactions and Physical Properties, Academic Press, 1982
- Annulenes, Benzo-, Hetero-, Homo-Derivatives and Their Valence Isomers, three volumes, CRC Press, 1986
- Modeling of Cancer Genesis and Prevention, CRC Press, 1990

He is the editor or co-editor of 8 books, including:

- Chemical Applications of Graph Theory, Academic Press, 1974; translated into Chinese in 1983
- From Chemical Topology to Three-Dimensional Geometry, Plenum Press, 1997
- Science and Technology Management, NATO Science Series, 1987
- Topological Indices and Related Descriptors in QSAR and QSPR, Gordon and Breach, 1999.

He has 800 articles published in peer-reviewed scientific periodicals, and 80 chapters in books edited by other authors. He holds 25 patents. As of 2024, his Google Scholar h-index is 73.

== Memberships ==
In 1963, he was elected as corresponding member of the Romanian Academy, Chemistry Section (youngest member among the other 12-14 corresponding members). In 2013 a special issue of International Journal of Chemical Modeling was dedicated to the half-century anniversary for this election. Due to political circumstances, the promotion to titular member occurred only after the fall of the communist regime, in 1990.

He was elected as member of the World Academy of Theoretical Organic Chemists, Paris in 1983; titular member of the Romanian Academy of Technical Sciences, Bucharest in 1993; titular member of the American-Romanian Academy of Sciences, Arts and Letters in 1995; honorary member of the Hungarian Academy of Sciences, Budapest in 2001; titular member of the International Academy of Mathematical Chemistry, Dubrovnik, Croatia in 2005. He also belonged to over 15 Editorial Boards.

== Honors and awards ==
- 1962: Romanian Academy’s Chemistry Prize
- 1963: Romanian Order of Labor
- 1966: Romanian Order of Scientific Merit
- 1994: Herman Skolnik Award of the Division of Chemical Information of the American Chemical Society
- 1997: Doctor Honoris Causa, West University of Timișoara, Romania
- 2000: National Order of Faithful Service, awarded by the President of Romania
- 2007: Romanian Academy’s Medal "Costin D. Nenitzescu" for distinguished chemical research results
- 2007: Distinguished Achievement Award for Research of the Association of Former Students, Texas A&M University
