= Ewa Kubicka =

Polish mathematician

Ewa Maria Kubicka is a Polish mathematician interested in graph theory and actuarial science. She is known for introducing the concept of the chromatic sum of a graph, the minimum possible sum when the vertices are labeled by natural numbers with no two adjacent vertices having equal labels.

Kubicka studied mathematics at Wrocław University of Science and Technology beginning in 1974, and earned a master's degree there in 1979. She came to Western Michigan University for graduate study, earning both a master's degree in computer science and a Ph.D. in mathematics in 1989. Her dissertation, The Chromatic Sum and Efficient Tree Algorithms, was supervised by Allen J. Schwenk. She became an assistant professor at Emory University and then, in 1990, moved to the University of Louisville, where she has been a full professor since 2004. At Louisville, she directs the actuarial program and is undergraduate advisor for mathematics.

She is known for having an erdős number of one.

== Selected publications ==
- Chartrand, G.; Gould, R.; Kubicka, E.; Kubicki, G. (1991), On rotation number for digraphs, Advances in Graph Theory, pp. 103–119.
- Goddard, W.; Kubicka, E.; Kubicki, G.; McMorris, F. R. (1994), On rotation number for digraphs, Mathematical Biosciences, vol. 123, pp. 97–104, doi:10.1016/0025-5564(94)90012-4, PMID 7827420.
- Kubicka, E.; Schwenk, A. (1989), "An introduction to chromatic sums", Introduction to chromatic sums, Proceedings of ACM 1989, pp. 39–45, doi:10.1145/75427.75430, ISBN 0897912993, S2CID 28544302.
- Kubicka, E.; Kubicki, G.; Vakalis, I. (1990), "Using Graph Distance in Object Recognition", Proceedings of the 1990 ACM annual conference on Cooperation - CSC '90, Proceedings of ACM 1990 Conference, pp. 39–45, doi:10.1145/100348.100355, ISBN 0897913485, S2CID 8580291.
- Erdős, P.; Kubicka, E.; Schwenk, A. (1990), Graphs that require many colors to achieve their chromatic sum, Congressus Numerantium, vol. 71, pp. 17–28.
- Kubicka, E. (1990), Constraints on the chromatic sequence for trees and graphs, Congressus Numerantium, vol. 76, pp. 219–230.
- Kubicka, E.; Kubicki, G.; Kountanis, D. (1990), Approximation algorithms for the chromatic sum, Proceedings of the First Great Lakes Computer Science Conference, Springer Verlag, pp. 15–21.
- Jacobson, M. S.; Kubicka, E.; Kubicki, G. (1991), Vertex rotation number for tournaments, Congressus Numerantium, vol. 82, pp. 201–210.
- Kubicka, E.; Kubicki, G. (1992), Constant time algorithm for generating binary rooted trees, Congressus Numerantium, vol. 90, pp. 57–64.
- Kubicka, E.; Kubicki, G.; McMorris, F. R. (1992), On agreement subtrees of two binary trees, Congressus Numerantium, vol. 88, pp. 217–224.
- Harary, F.; Jacobson, M. S.; Kubicka, E. (1993), The irregularity cost or sum of a graph, Applied Mathematics Letters, vol. 6, pp. 79–80.
