= Hyper-Wiener index =

In chemical graph theory, the hyper-Wiener index or hyper-Wiener number is a topological index of a molecule, used in biochemistry. The hyper-Wiener index is a generalization introduced by Milan Randić of the concept of the Wiener index, introduced by Harry Wiener. The hyper-Wiener index of a connected graph G is defined by

$$WW(G)=\frac 1 2 \sum_{u,v\in V(G)}(d(u,v)+d^2(u,v)),$$

where d(u,v) is the distance between vertex u and v. Hyper-Wiener index as topological index assigned to G = (V,E) is based on the distance function which is invariant under the action of the automorphism group of G.

Hyper-Wiener index can be used for the representation of computer networks and enhancing lattice hardware security. Hyper-Wiener indices used to limit the structure of a particle into a solitary number which signifies the sub-atomic stretching and electronic structures.

== Example ==
One-pentagonal carbon nanocone which is an infinite symmetric graph, consists of one pentagon as its core surrounded by layers of hexagons. If there are n layers, then the graph of the molecules is denoted by G_{n}. we have the following explicit formula for hyper-Wiener index of one-pentagonal carbon nanocone,

$$\operatorname{WW}(G_n)=20+\frac{533}{4}n+\frac{8501}{24}n^2+\frac{5795}{12}n^3+\frac{8575}{24}n^4+\frac{409}{3}n^5+21n^6$$

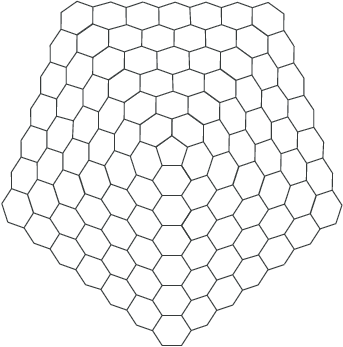
pentagonal-carbon-nanocone
