= Yousef Alavi =

Iranian born American mathematician (1928- 2013)

- Born: March 19, 1928; Ahvaz, Pahlavi Iran
- Died: May 21, 2013 (aged 85)
- Education: Michigan State University (PhD, 1958)
- Known for: Combinatorics, graph theory
- Awards: Distinguished Service Award, Michigan Section of the MAA (1987)
- Scientific career
- Fields: Mathematics
- Workplaces: Western Michigan University

Yousef Alavi (March 19, 1928 – May 21, 2013) was an Iranian-American mathematician, based at Western Michigan University (WMU), who specialized in graph theory. He received his PhD from Michigan State University in 1958, and his career at WMU lasted until 1996. Alavi was a frequent collaborator with Don R. Lick and Jiuqiang Liu (both of Eastern Michigan University) as well as with Paul Erdős, and in 1987, the Michigan Section of the Mathematical Association of America (MAA) awarded him its first annual Distinguished Service Award.

== Early life and education (1928–1958) ==
Alavi was born in the city of Ahvaz in Pahlavi Iran in 1928. He moved to the United States in 1948. There, he earned a bachelor's degree in electrical engineering from Michigan State University in 1953, a master's in math from the same school in 1955, and a PhD in 1958.

== Career (1958–1996) ==
He was a professor of mathematics at WMU from 1958 until his retirement in 1996; he chaired the department from 1989 to 1992.

Alavi was known for complaining that "this is highly irregular!" He was also a frequent host for Erdős on his visits to Western Michigan. On one of these visits, these two things came together: he made his usual complaint at a time when Erdős and Ronald Graham were present. This sparked a discussion on what it might mean for a graph to be highly irregular, kicking off a line of joint research on highly irregular graphs through which Alavi obtained Erdős number one.

In 1987, he received the first Distinguished Service Award of the Michigan Section of the MAA due to his 30 years of service to the section; at that time, the Michigan House and Senate issued a special resolution honoring him.

=== Research ===
In 1987, Alavi, Erdős, Paresh J. Malde, and Allen J. Schwenk studied the vertex independence sequence $a_1, \dots, a_m$ of an undirected graph where m is the maximal order of any independent set, where $a_i$ denotes the number of independent sets on exactly i vertices. By taking the join of several complete graphs, they were able to show that this sequence can realize any possible permutation.

That same year, Alavi, Erdős, A. J. Boals, Gary Chartrand, and Ortrud Oellermann also introduced the notion of an ascending subgraph decomposition, where a graph is decomposed into a sequence of subgraphs such that each of those graphs is isomorphic to a subgraph of the next graph. They conjectured that every finite graph admits an ascending subgraph decomposition, and verified it for the cases of all paths, all cycles, and all graphs with at most 6 vertices.

In 1991, Alavi, Erdős, Mehdi Behzad, and Don R. Lick introduced the notion of the double vertex graph of any graph. Further research involving Alavi, Lick, and Jiuqiang Liu in 1993 and 1994 eventually led to a classification of which Hamiltonian graphs also have Hamiltonian double vertex graphs. In particular, the double vertex graph of the complete bipartite graph K(m, n) is not Hamiltonian unless the equation $(m - n)^2 = m + n$ holds.

== Death and legacy ==
Before his death, Alavi had been dedicated to his wife and son, both of whom ended up surviving him. He was remembered for possessing "great energy", "kindness", and "good humor".

Alavi died on May 21, 2013; his health had been worsening for several months prior. A private funeral was held for him at the Riverside Cemetery at noon on May 23, and a memorial service was held for him on June 29 in the Kanley Chapel.

In remembrance of Alavi, the "Yousef Alavi Memorial Symposium" was held from October 24 to 25, 2013, on the sixth floor of the Everett Tower at WMU, as well as the Fetzer Center. It was free and open to the public. Speakers included Fan Chung and Ronald Graham, both of the University of California, San Diego.
