= Lexicographic product =

In mathematics, a lexicographical or lexicographic product may be formed of

- graphs – see lexicographic product of graphs
- orders – see lexicographical order
