= Michael Jacobson =

Michael Jacobson may refer to:

- Michael F. Jacobson (born 1943), co-founder of the Center for Science in the Public Interest
- Michael P. Jacobson (born 1953), founder and director of the Institute for State and Local Governance at the City University of New York
- Michael Scott Jacobson, mathematician
- Michael Jacobson (athlete) (born 1997), American football and basketball player
- Michael Jacobson, investigator who compiled "File 17", which became the basis for The 28 Pages
- Michael Jacobson (born 1973), the asemic writing writer
- Mike Jacobson, politician and member of the Nebraska Legislature
