= Harry Wiener =

American chemist

Harry Wiener (October 29, 1924 in Vienna, Austria – November 8, 1998 in New York City, US) was an Austrian-American chemist, physician and psychologist, a pioneer in cheminformatics and chemical graph theory, and a long-time employee at Pfizer.

== Education and career ==
Wiener was born in Vienna in 1924 to Jewish parents Joseph Wiener and Beile Wiener. His family emigrated to New York City, US, in 1941 by way of France and Portugal. Wiener attended Brooklyn College and received a BS in chemistry in 1945. Wiener attended Long Island College of Medicine and obtained an MD in 1949. Wiener was appointed to the management team at Pfizer in 1958 and remained at the company until 1995, when he retired.

== Achievements ==
Wiener made important and fundamental contributions to the study of topological indices and established a correlation between the Wiener index and boiling points (hence viscosity and surface tension) of the paraffins. He laid the foundation of chemical graph theory, and built a bridge between group theory, graph theory, and chemistry.

The Wiener index and its generalization, the Hyper-Wiener index, have been used in predicting antibacterial activity in drugs to modeling crystalline phenomena. The Wiener index plays an important role in sociometry and the theory of social networks which was developed by Christophe Soulé et al., as well as Gromov hyperbolicity Parameters. The Wiener index also plays an important role in Nanotechnology.

== Personal life ==
Wiener married Charlotte Baran, a coworker at Pfizer, in 1982.
