= Ortrud Oellermann =

South African mathematician

- Born: Vryheid
- Awards: Silver British Association Medal; Meiring Naude Medal, Hall Medal

Academic background
- Education: University of Natal, Western Michigan University
- Thesis: Generalized Connectivity in Graphs
- Doctoral advisor: Gary Chartrand

Academic work
- Discipline: Mathematics
- Sub-discipline: graph theory
- Institutions: University of Durban-Westville, Western Michigan University, University of Natal, Brandon University, University of Winnipeg
- Notable works: Applied and Algorithmic Graph Theory

Ortrud R. Oellermann is a South African mathematician specializing in graph theory. She is a professor of mathematics at the University of Winnipeg.

== Education and career ==
Oellermann was born in Vryheid. She earned a bachelor's degree, cum laude honours, and a master's degree at the University of Natal in 1981, 1982, and 1983 respectively, as a student of Henda Swart. She completed her Ph.D. in 1986 at Western Michigan University. Her dissertation was Generalized Connectivity in Graphs and was supervised by Gary Chartrand.

Oellermann taught at the University of Durban-Westville, Western Michigan University, University of Natal, and Brandon University, before moving to Winnipeg in 1996. At Winnipeg, she was co-chair of mathematics and statistics for 2011–2013.

== Contributions ==
With Gary Chartrand, Oellermann is the author of the book Applied and Algorithmic Graph Theory (McGraw Hill, 1993).^{[AA]}

She is also the author of well-cited research publications on metric dimension of graphs^{[MD]}, on distance-based notions of convex hulls in graphs,^{[CS]} and on highly irregular graphs in which every vertex has a neighborhood in which all degrees are distinct.^{[IG]} The phrase "highly irregular" was a catchphrase of her co-author Yousef Alavi; because of this, Ronald Graham suggested that there should be a concept of highly irregular graphs, by analogy to the regular graphs, and Oellermann came up with the definition of these graphs.

== Recognition ==
In 1991, Oellermann was the winner of the annual Silver British Association Medal of the Southern Africa Association for the Advancement of Science. She won the Meiring Naude Medal of the Royal Society of South Africa in 1994. She was also one of three winners of the Hall Medal of the Institute of Combinatorics and its Applications in 1994, the first year the medal was awarded.

== Awards ==
- She has been recognized with the Erica and Arnold Rogers Research Award for Excellence in Research

== Selected publications ==
=== Book ===
AA.	Chartrand, Gary; Oellermann, Ortrud R. (1993), Applied and Algorithmic Graph Theory, International Series in Pure and Applied Mathematics, New York: McGraw-Hill, Inc., ISBN 0-07-557101-3, MR 1211413

=== Research articles ===
IG.	Alavi, Yousef; Chartrand, Gary; Chung, F. R. K.; Erdős, Paul; Graham, R. L.; Oellermann, Ortrud R. (1987), "Highly irregular graphs", Journal of Graph Theory, 11 (2): 235–249, doi:10.1002/jgt.3190110214, MR 0889356

MD.	Chartrand, Gary; Eroh, Linda; Johnson, Mark A.; Oellermann, Ortrud R. (2000), "Resolvability in graphs and the metric dimension of a graph" (PDF), Discrete Applied Mathematics, 105 (1–3): 99–113, doi:10.1016/S0166-218X(00)00198-0, MR 1780464

CS.	Cáceres, José; Márquez, Alberto; Oellermann, Ortrud R.; Luz Puertas, María (2005), "Rebuilding convex sets in graphs", Discrete Mathematics, 297 (1–3): 26–37, doi:10.1016/j.disc.2005.03.020, hdl:11441/34391, MR 2159429
