= Ping Zhang (graph theorist) =

American mathematician

Ping Zhang is a mathematician specializing in graph theory. She is a professor of mathematics at Western Michigan University and the author of many textbooks on graph theory and mathematical proof.

Zhang earned a master's degree in 1989 from the University of Jordan, working there on ring theory with Hasan Al-Ezeh. She completed her Ph.D. in 1995 at Michigan State University. Her dissertation, in algebraic combinatorics, was Subposets of Boolean Algebras, and was supervised by Bruce Sagan.

After a short-term position at the University of Texas at El Paso, she joined the Western Michigan faculty in 1996.

== Books ==
Zhang is the author of:

- Mathematical Proofs: A Transition to Advanced Mathematics (with Gary Chartrand and A. D. Polimeni, Addison-Wesley, 2002; 2nd ed., 2007; 3rd ed., 2012)
- Introduction to Graph Theory (with Gary Chartrand, McGraw-Hill, 2004; Chinese ed., 2006); revised as A First Course in Graph Theory (Dover, 2012)
- Chromatic Graph Theory (with Gary Chartrand, CRC Press, 2008)
- Graphs & Digraphs (by Gary Chartrand and Linda Lesniak, with Zhang added as a co-author on the 5th ed., CRC Press, 2010)
- Discrete Mathematics (with Gary Chartrand, Waveland Press, 2011)
- Covering Walks in Graphs (with Futaba Fujie, Springer, 2014)
- Color-Induced Graph Colorings (Springer, 2015)
- The Fascinating World of Graph Theory (with Arthur T. Benjamin and Gary Chartrand, Princeton University Press, 2015)
- A Kaleidoscopic View of Graph Colorings (Springer, 2016)
- How to Label a Graph (with Gary Chartrand and Cooroo Egan, Springer, 2019) MR 3932147
- Irregularity in Graphs (with Akbar Ali and Gary Chartrand, Springer, 2021) MR 4292275

She is also the co-editor of:

- Handbook of Graph Theory (originally edited by Jonathan L. Gross and Jay Yellen, with Zhang added as a co-editor on the 2nd ed., CRC Press, 2013)
