= Michael Scott Jacobson =

American mathematician

Michael S. Jacobson is a mathematician, and Professor of Mathematical & Statistical Sciences in the Department of Mathematical & Statistical Science at the University of Colorado Denver. He served as Chair from 2003 to 2012 and was on loan serving as a program director in EHR/DUE at the National Science Foundation.

== Early life ==
Jacobson did his undergraduate studies at SUNY Stony Brook in mathematics, graduating in 1975 and received his MS and Ph.D. in 1977 and 1980, respectively, from Emory University under the supervision of Henry S. Sharp Jr. He spent 23 years at the University of Louisville, where in addition to being promoted to Professor in 1988, also served as Department Chair and Associate Dean for Research and Graduate Studies.

== Current work ==
Jacobson has been at the University of Colorado Denver since 2003.

== Mathematics ==
Jacobson specializes in combinatorics and in particular graph theory. He has published more than 140 mathematical papers on topics including Ramsey theory, Hamiltonian graphs, domination in graphs and extremal graph theory. He has had over 70 collaborators including Kenneth Bogart, Stefan Burr, Gary Chartrand, Guantao Chen, Paul Erdős, Ralph Faudree, Ron Gould, András Gyárfás, Frank Harary, Stephen Hedetniemi, Linda Lesniak, Fred McMorris, K. Brooks Reid, Richard Schelp, Edward Scheinerman and Douglas B. West.
