= Milan Randić =

Croatian American scientist (born 1930)

- Born: Belgrade, Yugoslavia, modern day Serbia
- Education: University of Zagreb; University of Cambridge
- Awards: Herman Skolnik Award (1996)
- Scientific career
- Fields: Computational chemistry; Mathematical chemistry
- Workplaces: Ruđer Bošković Institute; Drake University

Milan Randić (born 1 October 1930) is a Croatian American scientist recognized as one of the leading experts in the field of computational chemistry.

== Birth and education ==
Randić was born in the city of Belgrade, where his parents, originally from Kostrena in the Croatian Primorje, lived at the time. Kostrena is well known for its maritime tradition, with many shipowners and seamen among its residents. Randić's ancestors were shipowners and captains. In 1941, his family moved to Zagreb, where he continued his education. After completing Gymnasium in Zagreb, he studied Theoretical Physics at the University of Zagreb from 1949 to 1953. He then studied for Ph. D degree at the University of Cambridge, England from 1954 to 1958.

== Academic career ==
From 1960 to 1970, Randić worked at the Ruđer Bošković Institute in Zagreb, Croatia, where he founded the Theoretical Chemistry Group. Between 1971 and 1980, he was a visiting professor at various universities in the United States, including Johns Hopkins, MIT, Harvard, Tufts, and Cornell. His research during this period increasingly focused on the application of Discrete Mathematics and Graph Theory to the characterization of molecules and biomolecules.

From 1980 to 1997, Randić was a professor in the Department of Mathematics and Computer Science at Drake University in Des Moines, Iowa. Over the past 15 years, he has spent three months each year at the National Institute of Chemistry in Ljubljana, Slovenia, collaborating with scientists in its Laboratory for Chemometrics.

== Research and achievements ==
Randić has been a major contributor to the development of mathematical chemistry, in particular to the development and use of molecular descriptors based on the use of Graph Theory. In 1975 he introduced the Randić index, the first connectivity index, which has been widely used in the characterization of molecules.

He is a corresponding member of the Croatian Academy of Sciences and Arts and founder of the International Academy of Mathematical Chemistry, headquartered in Dubrovnik, Croatia. Since 2000, his research has shifted towards Bioinformatics, focusing on the graphical representation and numerical characterization of DNA, proteins, and the proteome. Despite this shift, his interest in Kekulé valence structures and aromaticity remains strong. He is an Honorary Member of The Croatian Chemical Society, The International Academy of Mathematical Chemistry, and The National Institute of Chemistry, Ljubljana, Slovenia.

Randić is also interested in developing Nobel, a universal ideographic writing system.

== See also ==
- Chemical graph theory
- Hyper-Wiener index
- Resistance distance

== Selected publications ==
- Randić, M. (1975). "Characterization of molecular branching". Journal of the American Chemical Society. 97 (23): 6609–6615. doi:10.1021/ja00856a001.
- Randić, M. (2003). "Aromaticity of Polycyclic Conjugated Hydrocarbons". Chemical Reviews. 103 (9): 3449–3605. doi:10.1021/cr9903656. PMID 12964878.
