= Saturation (graph theory) =

A complete 3-partite graph, which is C_{4}-saturated

In extremal graph theory, given a graph $H$, a graph $G$ is said to be $H$-saturated if $G$ does not contain a copy of $H$ as a subgraph, but adding any edge to $G$ creates a copy of $H$. The saturation number, denoted $\operatorname{sat}(n,H)$, is the minimum number of edges in an $H$-saturated graph on $n$ vertices. The graph saturation problem is the problem of determining $\operatorname{sat}(n,H)$ for all graphs $H$ and positive integers $n$.

The saturation number was introduced in 1964 by Erdős, Hajnal, and Moon as a dual to the extremal number $\operatorname{ex}(n,H)$. The extremal number $\operatorname{ex}(n,H)$ is the maximum number of edges in an $H$-saturated graph on $n$ vertices; this is equivalent to its original definition as the maximum number of edges in an $n$-vertex graph with no copy of $H$.

== Results ==
Trivially, all complete bipartite graphs (with at least three edges) are C_{3}-saturated, and more generally, all k-partite graphs (with at least $k+1$ edges) are C_{k+1}-saturated.

=== Complete graphs ===
The following theorem exactly determines the saturation number for complete graphs.

Theorem (Erdős, Hajnal, and Moon, 1964). For integers $n,r$ satisfying $2 \le r \le n$, $\operatorname{sat}(n,K_r) = (r-2)(n-r+2) + \binom{r-2}{2}$, and the unique $K_r$-saturated graph on $n$ vertices and $\operatorname{sat}(n,K_r)$ edges is the graph join of $K_{r-2}$ and the empty graph $\overline{K}_{n-r+2}$.

=== General bounds ===
It follows from the definitions that $\operatorname{sat}(n,H) \le \operatorname{ex}(n,H)$. In contrast to the extremal number, however, for a fixed graph $H$, the saturation number $\operatorname{sat}(n,H)$ is always at most linear in $n$.

Theorem (Kászonyi and Tuza, 1986). For any fixed graph $H$, if $H$ has an isolated edge, then $\operatorname{sat}(n,H) = c_H+o(1)$ for some constant $c_H$, and otherwise, $\operatorname{sat}(n,H) = \Theta(n)$. In particular, $\operatorname{sat}(n,H)=O(n)$.

It is conjectured that a stronger form of asymptotic stability holds.

Conjecture (Tuza, 1986). For any graph $H$, $\lim_{n\to\infty}\frac{\operatorname{sat}(n,H)}{n}$ exists.

A survey by Currie, J. Faudree, R. Faudree, and Schmitt describes progress on the graph saturation problem and related problems.
