= Graph product =

Binary operation on graphs

In graph theory, a graph product is a binary operation on graphs. Specifically, it is an operation that takes two graphs G_{1} and G_{2} and produces a graph H with the following properties:

- The vertex set of H is the Cartesian product V(G_{1}) × V(G_{2}), where V(G_{1}) and V(G_{2}) are the vertex sets of G_{1} and G_{2}, respectively.
- Two vertices (a_{1},a_{2}) and (b_{1},b_{2}) of H are connected by an edge, iff a condition about a_{1}, b_{1} in G_{1} and a_{2}, b_{2} in G_{2} is fulfilled.

The graph products differ in what exactly this condition is. It is always about whether or not the vertices a_{n}, b_{n} in G_{n} are equal or connected by an edge.

The terminology and notation for specific graph products in the literature varies quite a lot; even if the following may be considered somewhat standard, readers are advised to check what definition a particular author uses for a graph product, especially in older texts.

Even for more standard definitions, it is not always consistent in the literature how to handle self-loops. The formulas below for the number of edges in a product also may fail when including self-loops. For example, the tensor product of a single vertex self-loop with itself is another single vertex self-loop with $E=1$, and not $E=2$ as the formula $E_{G\times H} = 2 E_{G} E_{H}$ would suggest.

== Overview table ==
The following table shows the most common graph products, with $\sim$ denoting "is connected by an edge to", and $\not\sim$ denoting non-adjacency. While $\not\sim$ does allow equality, $\not\simeq$ means they must be distinct and non-adjacent. The operator symbols listed here are by no means standard, especially in older papers.

Name	Condition for $(a_1, a_2) \sim (b_1, b_2)$		Number of edges $\begin{array}{cc} v_1 = \vert\mathrm{V}(G_1)\vert & v_2 = \vert\mathrm{V}(G_2)\vert \\ e_1 = \vert\mathrm{E}(G_1)\vert & e_2 = \vert\mathrm{E}(G_2)\vert \end{array}$	Example
Name		with $a_n ~\text{rel}~ b_n$ abbreviated as $\text{rel}_n$	Number of edges $\begin{array}{cc} v_1 = \vert\mathrm{V}(G_1)\vert & v_2 = \vert\mathrm{V}(G_2)\vert \\ e_1 = \vert\mathrm{E}(G_1)\vert & e_2 = \vert\mathrm{E}(G_2)\vert \end{array}$	Example
Cartesian product (box product) $G_1 \square G_2$	$a_1 = b_1 ~\land~ a_2 \sim b_2$ $\lor$ $a_1 \sim b_1 ~\land~ a_2 = b_2$	$=_1 ~ \sim_2$ $\lor$ $\sim_1 ~ =_2$	$v_1 ~ e_2 ~+~ e_1 ~ v_2$	
Tensor product (Kronecker product, categorical product) $G_1 \times G_2$	$a_1 \sim b_1 ~\land~ a_2 \sim b_2$	$\sim_1 ~ \sim_2$	$2 ~ e_1 ~ e_2$	
Strong product (Normal product, AND product) $G_1 \boxtimes G_2$ $= (G_1 \times G_2) \cup (G_1 \square G_2)$	$a_1 = b_1 ~\land~ a_2 \sim b_2$ $\lor$ $a_1 \sim b_1 ~\land~ a_2 = b_2$ $\lor$ $a_1 \sim b_1 ~\land~ a_2 \sim b_2$	$=_1 ~ \sim_2$ $\lor$ $\sim_1 ~ =_2$ $\lor$ $\sim_1 ~ \sim_2$	$v_1 ~ e_2 ~+~ e_1 ~ v_2 ~+~ 2 ~ e_1 ~ e_2$	
Lexicographical product $G_1 \cdot G_2$ or $G_1[G_2]$	$a_1 \sim b_1$ $\lor$ $a_1 = b_1 ~\land~ a_2 \sim b_2$	$\sim_1$ $\lor$ $=_1 ~ \sim_2$	$v_1 ~ e_2 ~+~ e_1 ~ v_2^2$	
Co-normal product (disjunctive product, OR product) $G_1 * G_2$ or $G_1 \lor G_2$ $= G_1[G_2] \cup G_2[G_1]$ $= \overline{\;\overline{G_1}\boxtimes\overline{G_2}\;}$	$a_1 \sim b_1$ $\lor$ $a_2 \sim b_2$	$\sim_1$ $\lor$ $\sim_2$	$v_1^2 ~ e_2 ~+~ e_1 ~ v_2^2 ~-~ 2 ~ e_1 ~ e_2$	
Modular product $G_1 \diamond G_2$ $= (G_1 \boxtimes G_2) \cup (\overline{G_1} \times \overline{G_2})$	$a_1 \sim b_1 ~\land~ a_2 \sim b_2$ $\lor$ $a_1 \not\simeq b_1 ~\land~ a_2 \not\simeq b_2$	$\sim_1 ~ \sim_2$ $\lor$ $\not\simeq_1 ~ \not\simeq_2$		
Rooted product	see article		$v_1 ~ e_2 ~+~ e_1$	
Zig-zag product	see article		see article	see article
Replacement product				
Homomorphic product (Note: The hom-product of is the graph complement of the homomorphic product of.) $G_1 \ltimes G_2$	$a_1 = b_1$ $\lor$ $a_1 \sim b_1 ~\land~ a_2 \not\sim b_2$	$=_1$ $\lor$ $\sim_1 ~ \not\sim_2$	$v_1 v_2 (v_2 - 1) / 2 + e_1 (v_2^2 - 2 e_2)$	

In general, a graph product is determined by any condition for $(a_1, a_2) \sim (b_1, b_2)$ that can be expressed in terms of $a_n = b_n$ and $a_n \sim b_n$.

== Mnemonic ==
Let $K_2$ be the complete graph on two vertices (i.e. a single edge). The product graphs $K_2 \square K_2$, $K_2 \times K_2$, and $K_2 \boxtimes K_2$ look exactly like the graph representing the operator. For example, $K_2 \square K_2$ is a four cycle (a square) and $K_2 \boxtimes K_2$ is the complete graph on four vertices.

The $G_1[G_2]$ notation for lexicographic product serves as a reminder that this product is not commutative. The resulting graph looks like substituting a copy of $G_2$ for every vertex of $G_1$.

== See also ==
- Graph operations
