= Replacement product =

Binary operation on mathematical graphs

The replacement product $G \circ H$ of K_{6} and C_{5}.

In graph theory, the replacement product of two graphs is a graph product that can be used to reduce the degree of a graph while maintaining its connectivity.

Suppose G is a d-regular graph and H is an e-regular graph with vertex set {0, …, d – 1}. Let R denote the replacement product of G and H. The vertex set of R is the Cartesian product V(G) × V(H). For each vertex u in V(G) and for each edge (i, j) in E(H), the vertex (u, i) is adjacent to (u, j) in R. Furthermore, for each edge (u, v) in E(G), if v is the ith neighbor of u and u is the jth neighbor of v, the vertex (u, i) is adjacent to (v, j) in R.

If H is an e-regular graph, then R is an (e + 1)-regular graph.
