= Ronald Gould (mathematician) =

American mathematician

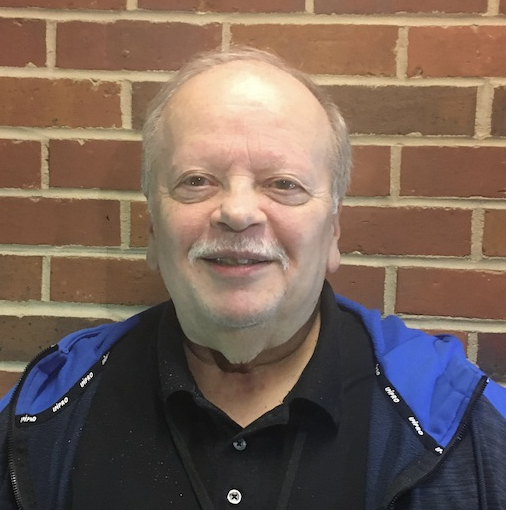
- Ronald Gould in 2019 at the Mississippi Discrete Mathematics Workshop
- Born: Ronald James Gould; April 15, 1950 (age 76)
- Other name: Ron Gould
- Education: Western Michigan University (Ph.D.); State University of New York at Fredonia (B.S.)
- Scientific career
- Fields: Mathematics
- Workplaces: Emory University
- Thesis: Traceability in Graphs (1979)
- Doctoral advisor: Gary Chartrand
- Website: https://www.math.emory.edu/~rg/

Ronald James Gould (born April 15, 1950) is an American mathematician specializing in combinatorics and graph theory. He is a Goodrich C. White professor emeritus in the Emory University Department of Mathematics.

== Education and career ==
After attending SUNY Fredonia for his undergraduate degree, Gould received his Ph.D. in 1979 from Western Michigan University. His thesis was titled Traceability in Graphs, and was completed under the supervision of Gary Chartrand. He spent a short period as a lecturer at San Jose State University in 1978 and 1979, then moved to Emory University in 1979. He was named to the Goodrich C. White professorship in 2001, and retired in 2016.

Gould is most noted for his work in the area of Hamiltonian graph theory. He is the author of the book Mathematics in Games, Sports, and Gambling: The Games People Play (2010).
