= Disjoint union of graphs =

Binary operation combining the vertex and edge sets of two graphs

A cluster graph, the disjoint union of complete graphs

In graph theory, the disjoint union of graphs is an operation that combines two or more graphs to form a larger graph. It is analogous to the disjoint union of sets and is constructed by making the vertex set of the result be the disjoint union of the vertex sets of the given graphs and by making the edge set of the result be the disjoint union of the edge sets of the given graphs. Any disjoint union of two or more nonempty graphs is necessarily disconnected.

== Notation ==
The disjoint union is also called the graph sum and may be represented either by a plus sign or a circled plus sign: If $G$ and $H$ are two graphs, then $G+H$ or $G\oplus H$ denotes their disjoint union.

== Related graph classes ==
Certain special classes of graphs may be represented using disjoint union operations. In particular:

- The forests are the disjoint unions of trees.
- The cluster graphs are the disjoint unions of complete graphs.
- The 2-regular graphs are the disjoint unions of cycle graphs.

More generally, every graph is the disjoint union of connected graphs, its connected components.

The cographs are the graphs that can be constructed from single-vertex graphs by a combination of disjoint union and complement operations.

== See also ==
- Join (graph theory)
- Graph minor
