= International Academy of Mathematical Chemistry =

Organization in Croatia

The International Academy of Mathematical Chemistry (IAMC) was founded in Dubrovnik, Croatia, in 2005 by Milan Randić. It is an organization for chemistry and mathematics avocation; its predecessors have been around since the 1930s. There are 88 Academy members (as of 2011) from around the world (27 countries), comprising six scientists awarded the Nobel Prize.

== Governing body of the IAMC ==
- 2005–2007:
  - President: Alexandru Balaban
  - Vice-president: Milan Randić
  - Secretary: Ante Graovac
  - Treasurer: Dejan Plavšić
- 2008–2011:
  - President: Roberto Todeschini
  - Vice-president: Tomaž Pisanski
  - Secretary: Ante Graovac
  - Treasurer: Dražen Vikić-Topić
  - Member: Ivan Gutman
  - Member: Nikolai Zefirov
- since 2011:
  - President: Roberto Todeschini
  - Vice-president: Edward C. Kirby
  - Vice-president: Sandi Klavžar
  - Secretary: Ante Graovac
  - Treasurer: Dražen Vikić-Topić
  - Member: Ivan Gutman
  - Member: Nikolai Zefirov
- since 2019:
  - President:
  - Vice-president: Douglas J. Klein
  - Vice-president: Xueliang Li
  - Vice-president: Sandi Klavžar
  - Vice-president: Tomaž Pisanski
  - Secretary: Boris Furtula
  - Treasurer:
  - Member: Ivan Gutman

== IAMC yearly meetings ==
- 2005 – Dubrovik, Croatia
- 2006 – Dubrovik, Croatia
- 2007 – Dubrovik, Croatia
- 2008 – Verbania, Italy
- 2009 – Dubrovik, Croatia
- 2010 – Dubrovik, Croatia
- 2011 – Bled, Slovenia
- 2012 – Verona, Italy
- 2014 – Split, Croatia
- 2015 – Kranjska Gora, Slovenia
- 2016 – Tianjin, China
- 2017 – Cluj, Romania
- 2019 – Bled, Slovenia
- 2023 – Kranjska Gora, Slovenia

== See also ==
- Mathematical chemistry
