= Molecular graph =

Representation of molecules in terms of graph theory

Molecular structure of caffeine. Methyl groups are implied, but not visualized.

In chemical graph theory and in mathematical chemistry, a molecular graph or chemical graph is a representation of the structural formula of a chemical compound in terms of graph theory. A chemical graph is a labeled graph whose vertices correspond to the atoms of the compound and edges correspond to chemical bonds. Its vertices are labeled with the kinds of the corresponding atoms and edges are labeled with the types of bonds. For particular purposes any of the labelings may be ignored.

A hydrogen-depleted molecular graph or hydrogen-suppressed molecular graph is the molecular graph with hydrogen vertices deleted.

In some important cases (topological index calculation etc.) the following classical definition is sufficient: a molecular graph is a connected, undirected graph which admits a one-to-one correspondence with the structural formula of a chemical compound in which the vertices of the graph correspond to atoms of the molecule and edges of the graph correspond to chemical bonds between these atoms. One variant is to represent materials as infinite Euclidean graphs, in particular, crystals as periodic graphs.

== History ==
Arthur Cayley was probably the first to publish results that consider molecular graphs as early as in 1874, even before the introduction of the term "graph". For the purposes of enumeration of isomers, Cayley considered "diagrams" made of points labelled by atoms and connected by links into an assemblage. He further introduced the terms plerogram and kenogram, which are the molecular graph and the hydrogen-suppressed molecular graph respectively. If one continues to delete atoms connected by a single link further, one arrives at a mere kenogram, possibly empty.

Danail Bonchev in his Chemical Graph Theory traces the origins of representation of chemical forces by diagrams which may be called "chemical graphs" to as early as the mid-18th century. In the early 18th century, Isaac Newton's notion of gravity had led to speculative ideas that atoms are held together by some kind of "gravitational force". In particular, since 1758 Scottish chemist William Cullen in his lectures used what he called "affinity diagrams" to represent forces supposedly existing between pairs of molecules in a chemical reaction. In a 1789 book by William Higgins similar diagrams were used to represent forces within molecules. These and some other contemporary diagrams had no relation to chemical bonds: the latter notion was introduced only in the following century.

== See also ==
- Chemical graph generator
- Simplified molecular-input line-entry system
- Substructure search
