= Rooted product of graphs =

Binary operation performed on graphs

The rooted product of graphs.

In mathematical graph theory, the rooted product (or comb product) of a graph G and a rooted graph H is defined as follows: take |V(G)| copies of H, and for every vertex v_{i} of G, identify v_{i} with the root node of the i-th copy of H.

More formally, assuming that

$$\begin{align}
V(G) &= \{g_1, \ldots, g_n \}, \\
V(H) &= \{h_1, \ldots, h_m \},
\end{align}$$

and that the root node of H is h_{1}, define

$$G \circ H := (V, E)$$,

where

$$V = \left\{(g_i, h_j): 1\leq i\leq n, 1\leq j\leq m\right\}$$

and

$$E = \Bigl\{\bigl((g_i, h_1), (g_k, h_1)\bigr): (g_i, g_k) \in E(G)\Bigr\} \cup \bigcup_{i=1}^n \Bigl\{\bigl((g_i, h_j), (g_i, h_k)\bigr): (h_j, h_k) \in E(H)\Bigr\}$$.

If G is also rooted at g_{1}, one can view the product itself as rooted, at (g_{1}, h_{1}). The rooted product is a subgraph of the cartesian product of the same two graphs.

== Applications ==
The rooted product is especially relevant for trees, as the rooted product of two trees is another tree. For instance, Koh et al. (1980) used rooted products to find graceful numberings for a wide family of trees.

If H is a two-vertex complete graph K_{2}, then for any graph G, the rooted product of G and H has domination number exactly half of its number of vertices. Every connected graph in which the domination number is half the number of vertices arises in this way, with the exception of the four-vertex cycle graph. These graphs can be used to generate examples in which the bound of Vizing's conjecture, an unproven inequality between the domination number of the graphs in a different graph product, the cartesian product of graphs, is exactly met (Fink et al. 1985). They are also well-covered graphs.
