= Topological index =

In the fields of chemical graph theory, molecular topology, and mathematical chemistry, a topological index, also known as a connectivity index, is a type of molecular descriptor that is calculated based on the molecular graph of a chemical compound. Topological indices are numerical parameters of a graph which characterize its "topology" (i.e., graph structure) and are usually invariant under isomorphism. Topological indices are used for example in the development of quantitative structure–activity relationships (QSARs) in which the chemical or biological activity or other properties of molecules are correlated with their chemical structure.

== Calculation ==
Topological descriptors are derived from hydrogen-suppressed molecular graphs, in which the atoms are represented by vertices and the bonds by edges. The connections between the atoms can be described by various types of topological matrices (e.g., distance or adjacency matrices), which can be mathematically manipulated so as to derive a single number, usually known as graph invariant, graph-theoretical index or topological index. As a result, the topological index can be defined as two-dimensional descriptors that can be easily calculated from the molecular graphs, and do not depend on the way the graph is depicted or labeled and no need of energy minimization of the chemical structure.

== Types ==
The simplest topological indices do not recognize double bonds and atom types (C, N, O etc.) and ignore hydrogen atoms ("hydrogen suppressed") and defined for connected undirected molecular graphs only. More sophisticated topological indices also take into account the hybridization state of each of the atoms contained in the molecule. The Hosoya index is the first topological index recognized in chemical graph theory, and it is often referred to as "the" topological index. Other examples include the Wiener index, Randić's molecular connectivity index, Balaban's J index, and the TAU descriptors. The extended topochemical atom (ETA) indices have been developed based on refinement of TAU descriptors.

=== Global and local indices ===
The Hosoya index and Wiener index are global (integral) indices to describe the entire molecule. Bonchev and Polansky introduced the local (differential) index for every atom in a molecule. Other examples of local indices are modifications of Hosoya index.

=== Discrimination capability and superindices ===
A topological index may have the same value for a subset of different molecular graphs, i.e. the index is unable to discriminate the graphs from this subset. The discrimination capability is very important characteristic of topological index. To increase the discrimination capability a few topological indices may be combined to superindex.

=== Computational complexity ===
Computational complexity is another important characteristic of a topological index. The Wiener index, Randic's molecular connectivity index, Balaban's J index may be calculated by fast algorithms, in contrast to the Hosoya index and its modifications for which non-exponential algorithms are unknown.

=== List of topological indices ===
- Wiener index
- Hosoya index
- Hyper-Wiener index
- Estrada index
- Randić index
- Zagreb indices
- Szeged index
- Padmakar–Ivan index
- Atom-bond connectivity index
- Harmonic index
- Albertson index
- Gutman index
- Sombor index
- Arithmetic index
- Merrifield-Simmons index
- Rehan-Lanel indices
- Sum-connectivity index
- Total eccentricity index

== Application ==
=== QSAR ===
QSARs represent predictive models derived from application of statistical tools correlating biological activity (including desirable therapeutic effect and undesirable side effects) of chemicals (drugs/toxicants/environmental pollutants) with descriptors representative of molecular structure and/or properties. QSARs are being applied in many disciplines for example risk assessment, toxicity prediction, and regulatory decisions in addition to drug discovery and lead optimization.

For example, ETA indices have been applied in the development of predictive QSAR/QSPR/QSTR models.
