= Ante Graovac =

Croatian scientist (1945–2012)

Ante Graovac (15 July 1945 in Split – 13 November 2012 in Zagreb) was a Croatian scientist known for his contribution to chemical graph theory. He was director of 26 successful annual meetings MATH/CHEM/COMP held in Dubrovnik. He was secretary of the International Academy of Mathematical Chemistry.

== Selected publications ==
- Graovac, Ante; Gutman, Ivan; Trinajstić, Nenad; Živković, Tomislav (1972), "Graph Theory and Molecular Orbitals - Application of Sachs Theorem", Theoretica Chimica Acta, 26 (1): 67–, doi:10.1007/BF00527654, S2CID 101611868.
