= Ruđer Bošković Institute =

Croatian research institute

Coordinates: 45.8294°N 15.9859°E

- Established: 1950
- Director: David Matthew Smith
- Staff: 521 (2013)
- Budget: €26.6 million (2013)
- Address: Bijenička cesta 54
- Location: Zagreb, Croatia
- Website: www.irb.hr

The Ruđer Bošković Institute (RBI; Croatian: Institut Ruđer Bošković, pronounced [instǐtuːt rûd͡ʑɛr bɔ̂ʃkɔʋit͡ɕ], IRB) is a research institute located in the Šalata neighborhood of Zagreb, Croatia, founded in 1950, which studies the sciences.

== Description ==
It is the largest Croatian research institute in the fields of the natural sciences and technology. The name of the institute, which honours the scientist Ruđer Bošković, was put forth by one of its founders, physicist Ivan Supek.

The institute has a multidisciplinary character; it employs approximately 550 academics and students from the fields of experimental and theoretical physics, chemistry and materials physics, organic and physical chemistry, biochemistry, molecular biology and medicine, environmental and marine research and computer science and electronics.

Within Croatia, RBI is a national institution dedicated to research, higher education and provision of support to the academic community, to state and local governments and to technology-based industry. Within the European Union, RBI forms a part of the European Research Area. Worldwide, RBI collaborates with many research institutions and universities upholding the same values and vision.

Approximately 75% of the institute's funding is provided by the Government of Croatia, through the Ministry of Science, Education and Sports.

== Divisions ==
The institute is organized into 14 research divisions and centers:

- Division of Theoretical Physics
- Division of Experimental Physics
- Division of Materials Physics
- Division of Electronics
- Division of Physical Chemistry
- Division of Organic Chemistry and Biochemistry
- Division of Materials Chemistry
- Division of Molecular Biology
- Division of Molecular Medicine
- Center for Marine Research
- Division for Marine and Environmental Research
- Division of Laser and Atomic Research and Development
- NMR Centre
- Centre for Informatics and Computing

== Annual Reports ==
Annual reports for the institute are available from 2002 to 2014 but apparently not after 2014.

- Pivac, Nela (2014). "Annual Report 2013" (PDF). Ruđer Bošković Institute.
