= Join (graph theory) =

Operation that combines two graphs

Join operation on graphs C_{4} (blue) and K_{4} (red).

In graph theory, the join operation is a graph operation that combines two graphs by connecting every vertex of one graph to every vertex of the other. The join of two graphs $G_1$ and $G_2$ is denoted $G_1 + G_2$, $G_1\vee G_2$, or $G_1 \nabla G_2$.

== Definition ==
Let $G_1 = (V_1, E_1)$ and $G_2 = (V_2, E_2)$ be two disjoint graphs. The join $G_1 + G_2$ is a graph with:

- Vertex set: $V(G_1 + G_2) = V_1 \cup V_2$
- Edge set: $E(G_1 + G_2) = E_1 \cup E_2 \cup \{uv \mid u \in V_1, v \in V_2\}$

In other words, the join contains all vertices and edges from both original graphs, plus new edges connecting every vertex in $G_1$ to every vertex in $G_2$.

== Examples ==
Several well-known graph families can be constructed using the join operation.

Complete bipartite graph
$K_{m,n} = \overline{K}_m + \overline{K}_n$ (join of two independent sets).
Wheel graph
$W_n = C_n + K_1$ (join of a cycle graph and a single vertex).
Star graph
$S_{n+1} = \overline{K}_n + K_1$ (join of a $n$ vertex empty graph and a single vertex).
Fan graph
$F_{m,n} = P_n + \overline{K}_m$ (join of a path graph with an empty graph).
Complete graph
$K_n = K_m + K_{n-m}$ (join of two complete graphs whose orders sum to $n$).
Cograph
Cographs are formed by repeated join and disjoint union operations starting from single vertices.
Windmill graph
$D_n^{(m)} = mK_{n-1} + K_1$ (join of $m$ copies of the complete graph on $n-1$ vertices with a single vertex).

== Properties ==
=== Basic properties ===
The join operation is commutative for unlabeled graphs: $G_1 + G_2 \cong G_2 + G_1$.

If $G_1$ has $p_1$ vertices and $q_1$ edges, and $G_2$ has $p_2$ vertices and $q_2$ edges, then $G_1 + G_2$ has $p_1 + p_2$ vertices and $q_1 + q_2 + p_1 p_2$ edges. If $p_1>0$ and $p_2>0$ then $G_1 + G_2$ is connected ($K_{p_1,p_2}$ is a subgraph).

=== Chromatic number ===
The chromatic number of the join satisfies:

$$\chi(G_1 + G_2) = \chi(G_1) + \chi(G_2)$$.

The join of a 5-cycle and a 6-clique and its representation as an Earth–Moon map

This property holds because vertices from $G_1$ and $G_2$ must use different colors (as they are all adjacent to each other), and within each original graph, the minimum coloring is preserved. It was used in a 1974 construction by Thom Sulanke related to the Earth–Moon problem of coloring graphs of thickness two. Sulanke observed that the join $C_5+K_6$ is a thickness-two graph requiring nine colors, still the largest number of colors known to be needed for this problem.

$G_1 + G_2$ is color critical if and only if $G_1$ and $G_2$ are both color critical.

== See also ==
- Disjoint union of graphs
- Graph minor
- Join (topology)
