= Gary Chartrand =

American-born mathematician

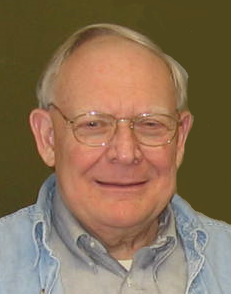
- Born: August 24, 1936
- Education: Michigan State University
- Scientific career
- Thesis: Graphs and Their Associated Line-Graphs
- Doctoral advisor: Edward Nordhaus
- Doctoral students: Ortrud Oellermann

Gary Theodore Chartrand (born 24 August 1936) is an American-born mathematician who specializes in graph theory. He is known for his textbooks on introductory graph theory and for the concept of a highly irregular graph.

== Biography ==
Gary Chartrand was born in 1936. He was raised in Sault Ste. Marie, Michigan and attended J. W. Sexton High School located in Lansing, Michigan. As an undergraduate student, he initially majored in chemical engineering, but switched to mathematics in his junior year, in which he also became a member of the honorary mathematics society Pi Mu Epsilon.

He earned his B.S. from Michigan State University, where he majored in mathematics and minored in physical sciences and foreign languages. Michigan State University also awarded him a Master of Science and a PhD for his work in graph theory in 1964. Chartrand became the first doctoral student of Edward Nordhaus, and the first doctoral student at Michigan State University to research graph theory. His dissertation was Graphs and Their Associated Line-Graphs. Chartrand worked with Frank Harary at the University of Michigan, where he spent a year as a Research Associate, and the two have published numerous papers together (along with other authors).

The topic of highly irregular graphs was introduced by Chartrand, Paul Erdős and Ortrud Oellermann.

Other contributions that Chartrand has made involve dominating sets, distance in graphs, and graph coloring. During his career at Western Michigan University, he advised 22 doctoral students in their research on aspects of graph theory. Chartrand is currently a professor emeritus of mathematics at Western Michigan University.

== Books ==
- 1977: Graphs as Mathematical Models, Prindle, Weber & Schmidt, MR 0490611 reprinted 1985 as Introductory Graph Theory MR 0783826.
- 1993: (with Ortrud R. Oellermann) Applied and Algorithmic Graph Theory, McGraw Hill MR 1211413.
- 2008: (with Ping Zhang) Chromatic Graph Theory, CRC Press MR 2450569.
- 2010: (with Linda Lesniak and Ping Zhang) Graphs & Digraphs, 5th edition, CRC Press MR 2766107.
- 2010: (with Ping Zhang) Discrete Mathematics, Waveland Press.
- 2012: (with Albert D. Polimeni & Ping Zhang) Mathematical Proofs: A Transition to Advanced Mathematics, 3rd edition, Pearson.
- 2012: (with Ping Zhang) A First Course in Graph Theory, Dover Publications.
- 2015: (with Arthur T. Benjamin and Ping Zhang) The Fascinating World of Graph Theory, Princeton University Press MR 3307972.
- 2019: (with Teresa W. Haynes, Michael A. Henning & Ping Zhang) From Domination to Coloring: Stephen Hedetniemi's Graph Theory and Beyond, SpringerBriefs in Mathematics.
- 2019: (with Cooroo Egan & Ping Zhang) How to Label a Graph, SpringerBriefs in Mathematics MR 3932147.
- 2021: (with Akbar Ali & Ping Zhang) Irregularity in Graphs, SpringerBriefs in Mathematics MR 4292275.
