= Mathematical chemistry =

Branch of applied mathematics

Mathematical chemistry is the area of research engaged in novel applications of mathematics to chemistry; it concerns itself principally with the mathematical modeling of chemical phenomena. Mathematical chemistry has also sometimes been called computer chemistry, but should not be confused with computational chemistry.

Major areas of research in mathematical chemistry include chemical graph theory, which deals with topology such as the mathematical study of isomerism and the development of topological descriptors or indices which find application in quantitative structure-property relationships; and chemical aspects of group theory, which finds applications in stereochemistry and quantum chemistry. Another important area is molecular knot theory and circuit topology that describe the topology of folded linear molecules such as proteins and nucleic acids.

The history of the approach may be traced back to the 19th century. Georg Helm published a treatise titled "The Principles of Mathematical Chemistry: The Energetics of Chemical Phenomena" in 1894. Some of the more contemporary periodical publications specializing in the field are MATCH Communications in Mathematical and in Computer Chemistry, first published in 1975, and the Journal of Mathematical Chemistry, first published in 1987. In 1986 a series of annual conferences MATH/CHEM/COMP taking place in Dubrovnik was initiated by the late Ante Graovac.

The basic models for mathematical chemistry are molecular graph and topological index.

In 2005 the International Academy of Mathematical Chemistry (IAMC) was founded in Dubrovnik (Croatia) by Milan Randić. The Academy has 82 members (2009) from all over the world, including six scientists awarded with a Nobel Prize.

== Mathematical chemistry software ==
=== Free or open-source ===
- Cantera
- CP2K
- GAMESS
- MOPAC
- NWChem
- Psi4

=== Proprietary ===
- Gaussian
- Spartan
- TURBOMOLE

== See also ==
- Chemical reaction network theory – Area of applied mathematics
- Cheminformatics – Computational chemistry
- Combinatorial chemistry – Compound library-based chemical synthesis method
- Molecular descriptor
- Molecular modelling – Discovering chemical properties by physical simulations
- List of quantum chemistry and solid state physics software
- List of software for molecular mechanics modeling
- Random graph theory of gelation – Mathematical theory for sol–gel processes

== Bibliography ==
- Molecular Descriptors for Chemoinformatics, by R. Todeschini and V. Consonni, Wiley-VCH, Weinheim, 2009.
- Mathematical Chemistry Series, by D. Bonchev, D. H. Rouvray (Eds.), Gordon and Breach Science Publisher, Amsterdam, 2000.
- Chemical Graph Theory, by N. Trinajstic, CRC Press, Boca Raton, 1992.
- Mathematical Concepts in Organic Chemistry, by I. Gutman, O. E. Polansky, Springer-Verlag, Berlin, 1986.
- Chemical Applications of Topology and Graph Theory, ed. by R. B. King, Elsevier, 1983.
- "Topological approach to the chemistry of conjugated molecules", by A. Graovac, I. Gutman, and N. Trinajstic, Lecture Notes in Chemistry, no.4, Springer-Verlag, Berlin, 1977.
