= Randić index =

Topological index in chemical graph theory

The Randić index, also known as the connectivity index, of a graph is the sum of bond contributions $1/(d_i d_j)^{1/2}$ where $d_i$ and $d_j$ are the degrees of the vertices making bond i ~ j.

== History ==
This graph invariant was introduced by Milan Randić in 1975. It is often used in chemoinformatics for investigations of organic compounds.
