= Star (graph theory) =

Tree graph with one central node and leaves of length 1

- The star S_{7}. (Some authors index this as S_{8}.)
- Vertices: k + 1
- Edges: k
- Diameter: 2
- Girth: $\infty$
- Chromatic number: 2
- Chromatic index: k
- Properties: Edge-transitive; Tree; Unit distance Bipartite
- Notation: S_{k}

In graph theory, the star S_{k} is the complete bipartite graph K_{1, k}, that is, it is a tree with one internal node and k leaves (Note: When k ≥ 2; for k = 0, it is the tree with one node, while for k = 1 it is the tree with two nodes, both of which are leaves.). Alternatively, some authors define S_{k} to be the tree of order k with maximum diameter 2, in which case a star of k > 2 has k − 1 leaves.

A star with 3 edges is called a claw.

The star S_{k} is edge-graceful when k is even and not when k is odd. It is an edge-transitive matchstick graph, and has diameter 2 (when k > 1), girth $\infty$ (it has no cycles), chromatic index k, and chromatic number 2 (when k > 0). Additionally, the star has large automorphism group, namely, the symmetric group on k letters.

Stars may also be described as the only connected graphs in which at most one vertex has degree greater than one.

== Relation to other graph families ==
Claws are notable in the definition of claw-free graphs, graphs that do not have any claw as an induced subgraph. They are also one of the exceptional cases of the Whitney graph isomorphism theorem: in general, graphs with isomorphic line graphs are themselves isomorphic, with the exception of the claw and the triangle K_{3}.

A star is a special kind of tree. As with any tree, stars may be encoded by a Prüfer sequence; the Prüfer sequence for a star K_{1,k} consists of k − 1 copies of the center vertex.

Several graph invariants are defined in terms of stars. Star arboricity is the minimum number of forests that a graph can be partitioned into such that each tree in each forest is a star, and the star chromatic number of a graph is the minimum number of colors needed to color its vertices in such a way that every two color classes together form a subgraph in which all connected components are stars. The graphs of branchwidth 1 are exactly the graphs in which each connected component is a star.

The star graphs S_{3}, S_{4}, S_{5} and S_{6}.

== Other applications ==
The set of distances between the vertices of a claw provides an example of a finite metric space that cannot be embedded isometrically into a Euclidean space of any dimension.

The star network, a computer network modeled after the star graph, is important in distributed computing.

A geometric realization of the star graph, formed by identifying the edges with intervals of some fixed length, is used as a local model of curves in tropical geometry. A tropical curve is defined to be a metric space that is locally isomorphic to a star-shaped metric graph.

== See also ==
- Starlike tree - a tree with at most one vertex of degree larger than 2; a subdivision of a star
- Star (simplicial complex) - a generalization of the concept of a star from a graph to an arbitrary simplicial complex.
