= Chemical graph theory =

Branch of mathematical chemistry

Chemical graph theory is the topology branch of mathematical chemistry which applies graph theory to mathematical modelling of chemical phenomena. The pioneers of chemical graph theory are Alexandru Balaban, Ante Graovac, Iván Gutman, Haruo Hosoya, Milan Randić and Nenad Trinajstić (also Harry Wiener and others). In 1988, it was reported that several hundred researchers worked in this area, producing about 500 articles annually. A number of monographs have been written in the area, including the two-volume comprehensive text by Trinajstić, Chemical Graph Theory, that summarized the field up to mid-1980s.

The adherents of the theory maintain that the properties of a chemical graph (i.e., a graph-theoretical representation of a molecule) give valuable insights into the chemical phenomena. Others contend that graphs play only a fringe role in chemical research. One variant of the theory is the representation of materials as infinite Euclidean graphs, particularly crystals by periodic graphs.

== See also ==
- Chemical graph generator
- Molecule mining
- MATH/CHEM/COMP
- Topological index
