= Blue Obelisk =

Informal group of chemists

- Formation: 2005
- Founder: Peter Murray-Rust
- Members: 23+
- Official language: English
- Budget: zero
- Website: http://www.blueobelisk.org/

Blue Obelisk is an informal group of chemists who promote open data, open source, and open standards; it was initiated by Peter Murray-Rust and others in 2005. Multiple open source cheminformatics projects associate themselves with the Blue Obelisk, among which, in alphabetical order, Avogadro, Bioclipse, cclib, Chemistry Development Kit, GaussSum, JChemPaint, JOELib, Kalzium, Openbabel, OpenSMILES, and UsefulChem.

Dependency diagram of some Blue Obelisk projects.

The project has handed out personal awards for achievements in promoting Open Data, Open Source and Open Standards. Among those who received a Blue Obelisk Award are:

- Christoph Steinbeck (2006)
- Geoff Hutchinson (2006)
- Bob Hanson (2006),
- Egon Willighagen (2007)
- Jean-Claude Bradley (2007)
- Ola Spjuth (2007)
- Noel O'Boyle (2010)
- Rajarshi Guha (2010)
- Cameron Neylon (2010)
- Alex Wade (2010)
- Nina Jeliazkova (2010)
- Henry Rzepa (2011)
- Dan Zaharevitz (2011)
- Sam Adams (2011)
- Jens Thomas (2011)
- Marcus Hanwell (2011)
- Roger Sayle (2011)
- the Environmental Molecular Sciences Laboratory (2012)
- Saulius Gražulis (2014)
- Antony Williams (2014)
- Daniel Lowe (2014)
- Andrew Lang (2014)
- Matthew H. Todd (2014)
- Greg Landrum (2016)
- Mark Forster (2016)
- John Mayfield (2017)

== See also ==
- Cheminformatics
