= MMPA =

MMPA is an acronym that may refer to:

- Marine Mammal Protection Act
- Copyright Term Extension Act (also known as the Mickey Mouse Protection Act)
- Matched molecular pair analysis (in Cheminformatics)
- El Tajín National Airport, ICAO code
