= AlvaDesc =

Software application for cheminformatics

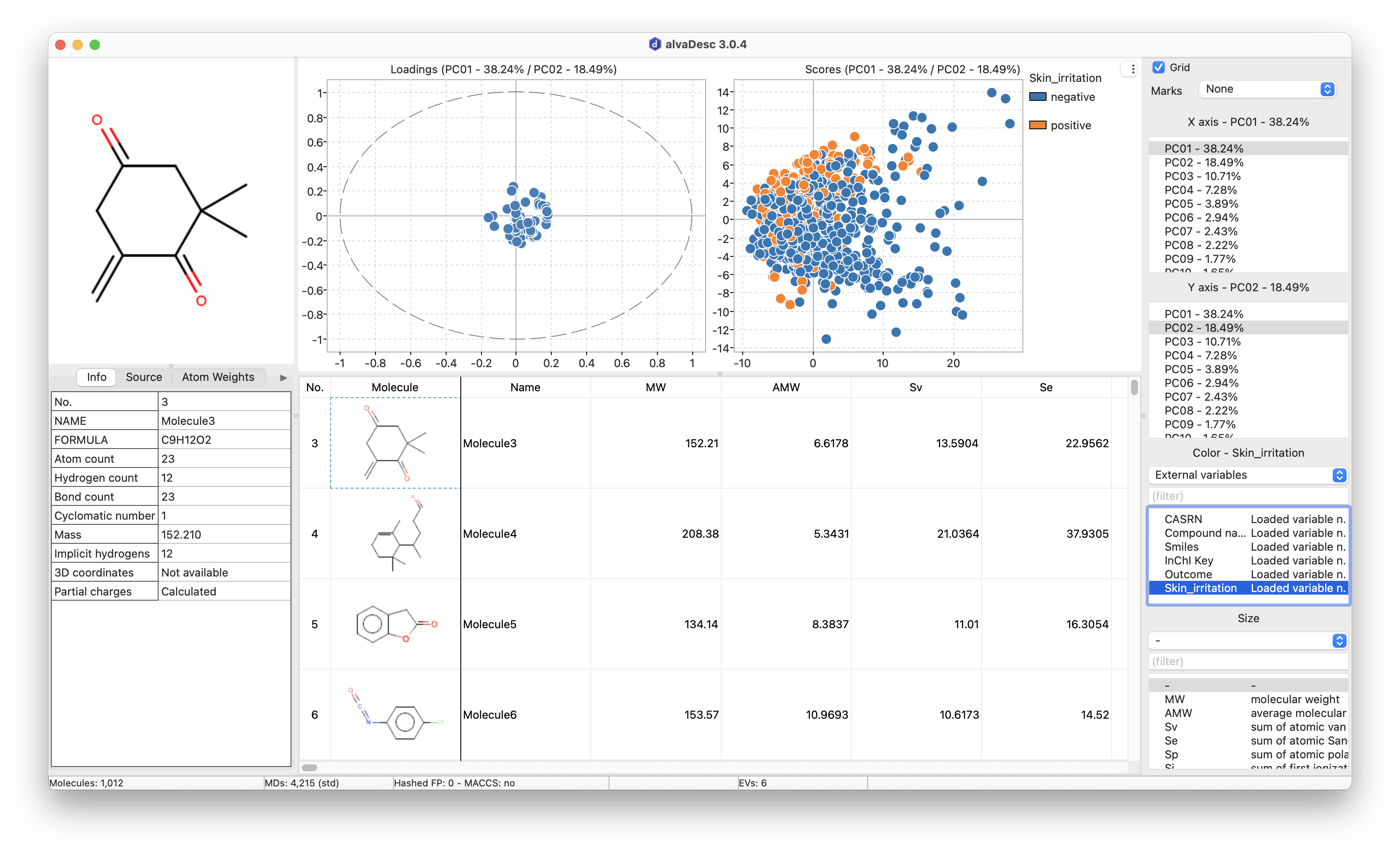
- AlvaDesc main user interface
- Developer: Alvascience
- Operating system: Windows, macOS, Linux
- Platform: x86-64, Apple silicon
- Available in: English
- Type: Cheminformatics
- License: Proprietary
- Website: www.alvascience.com/alvadesc/

AlvaDesc is a commercial software application for the calculation and analysis of molecular descriptors, fingerprints, and structural patterns. Developed by Alvascience, alvaDesc is used in cheminformatics and quantitative structure–activity relationship (QSAR) modeling to numerically describe molecular structures, aiding in chemical property prediction and machine learning applications.

== Overview ==
Molecular descriptors and fingerprints serve as mathematical representations of chemical compounds, enabling computational models to predict properties such as bioactivity, toxicity, and solubility.

== Features ==
AlvaDesc supports the calculation of molecular descriptors and fingerprints across multiple categories:

- 0D–3D molecular descriptors: including constitutional indices, topological indices, connectivity indices, geometrical descriptors, pharmacophore descriptors, charge descriptors, and more.
- Molecular properties: including LogP (octanol-water partition coefficient), molar refractivity, polar surface area (PSA), solvent-accessible surface area (SASA), and hydrogen bond donors/acceptors.
- Molecular fingerprints: including MACCS keys, Extended Connectivity Fingerprints (ECFP), Path-based fingerprints.
- Structural pattern detection: alvaDesc allows the identification of structural patterns in molecules using SMARTS-based matching, enabling the analysis of functional groups, substructures, and chemical motifs.
- 3D coordinate calculation: alvaDesc can generate 3D molecular structures from 1D/2D representations. The 3D coordinates calculation is performed using a Distance Geometry (DG) method, followed by a Force Field (FF) optimization.
- Descriptor analysis tools: including Principal Component Analysis (PCA), t-SNE analysis, correlation analysis, variable reduction.
- Support for disconnected structures: Handles salts, mixtures, ionic liquids, and metal complexes.
- Cross-platform compatibility: Available for Windows, macOS, and Linux, supporting both graphical user interface (GUI) and command-line interface (CLI).
- KNIME and Python integration: alvaDesc can be integrated into cheminformatics workflows using the KNIME analytics platform and Python scripting.

== See also ==
- Molecular descriptor
- Topological index
- Quantitative structure–activity relationship (QSAR)
