= List of cheminformatics toolkits =

Cheminformatics toolkits are notable software development kits that allow cheminformaticians to develop custom computer applications for use in virtual screening, chemical database mining, and structure-activity studies. Toolkits are often used for experimentation with new methodologies. Their most important functions deal with the manipulation of chemical structures and comparisons between structures. Programmatic access is provided to properties of individual bonds and atoms.

== Functionality ==
Toolkits provide the following functionality:

- Read and save structures in various chemistry file formats.
- Determine if one structure is a substructure of another (substructure matching).
- Determine if two structures are equal (exact matching).
- Identification of substructures common to structures in a set (maximal common substructure, MCS).
- Disassemble molecules, splitting into fragments.
- Assemble molecules from elements or submolecules.
- Apply reactions on input reactant structures, resulting in output of reaction product structures.
- Generate molecular fingerprints. Fingerprints are bit-vectors where individual bits correspond to the presence or absence of structural features. The most important use of fingerprints is in indexing of chemistry databases.

== List of notable cheminformatics toolkits ==
| Name | License | APIs | Home Page | Notes |
|---|---|---|---|---|
| CDK | Open source | Java, R, Python | https://cdk.github.io/ | |
| Indigo | Open source | Java, .NET, Python | https://github.com/epam/Indigo | |
| Molecular Operating Environment (MOE) | Proprietary | Scientific Vector Language | https://web.archive.org/web/20160909172415/http://www.chemcomp.com/MOE-Cheminformatics_and_QSAR.htm | |
| Open Babel | Open source | C++, Python, Java, Perl, C#, Ruby | http://openbabel.org/ | , |
| RDKit | BSD-3-Clause License | C++, Python | https://www.rdkit.org/ | |
| CDPKit | LGPL-2.1 | C++, Python | https://cdpkit.org/ | |
