= MPACC =

MPACC may refer to:

- Molecular Production and Characterisation Centre in the Department of Chemistry, University of Cambridge, England
- MPAcc, Master of Professional Accounting
