= GreenXchange =

- Company type: Private
- Founded: January 2010
- Country of origin: Switzerland
- Website: www.greenxchange.cc
- Current status: Defunct

GreenXchange (abbreviated as GX) was an online marketplace where companies share intellectual property developed by them in order to stir up innovation in industries in which they themselves do not compete. It was launched at Davos, Switzerland in January 2010 by Nike, Creative Commons and Best Buy.

== Overview and history ==
GreenXchange provided a standardized patent license structure, where patent-owners can control to whom and to what degree their intellectual property is made available. GreenXchange can be used by Nike, for example, to share its existing patents and intellectual property free of charge or for a fee, but usually only with companies with which Nike does not directly compete. Nike has listed on the exchange over 400 of its patents.

On January 11, 2011, the GreenXchange held an in-person Collaboratory that included attendance by Brooks, Nike, New Balance, Oregon based non-profits, the University of Oregon and University of Washington, and the U.S. Environmental Protection Agency.

Competing companies may also collaborate with one another via the exchange but usually only in ongoing research in a given field.

John Wilbanks, at that time vice president for Science at Creative Commons, said at the January 2010 launch: "There is so much duplication of effort and wasted resources when it comes to sustainability. We need to make it easier for individuals, companies, academia, and researchers to collaborate and share best practices."

Although the GreenXchange website is not active anymore, Nike says that they "have gained significant insights from this collaboration which continue to inform [their] strategy to bring sustainability innovations to scale".
