= Science Commons =

- Founded: 2005
- Founder: Lawrence Lessig
- Dissolved: 2009
- Type: Non-profit organization
- Purpose: Building infrastructure for open science
- Location: Cambridge, Massachusetts, United States
- Key people: John Wilbanks

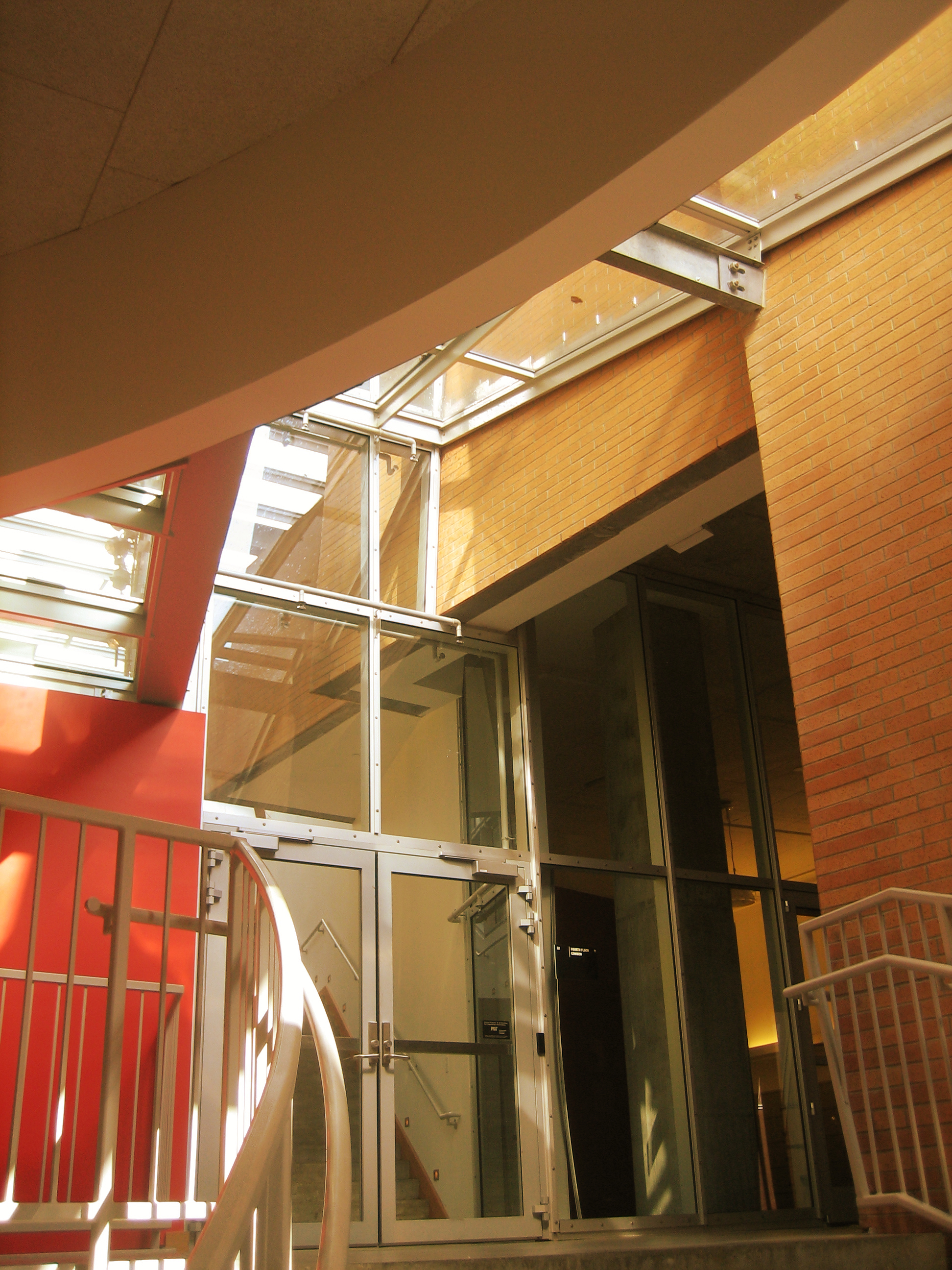
Just outside Science Commons offices, MIT Stata Center

Science Commons (SC) was a Creative Commons project for designing strategies and tools for faster, more efficient web-enabled scientific research. The organization's goals were to identify unnecessary barriers to research, craft policy guidelines and legal agreements to lower those barriers, and develop technology to make research data and materials easier to find and use. Its overarching goal was to speed the translation of data into discovery and thereby the value of research.

Science Commons was located at the MIT Computer Science and Artificial Intelligence Laboratory in the Ray and Maria Stata Center at the Massachusetts Institute of Technology in Cambridge, Massachusetts.

== History ==
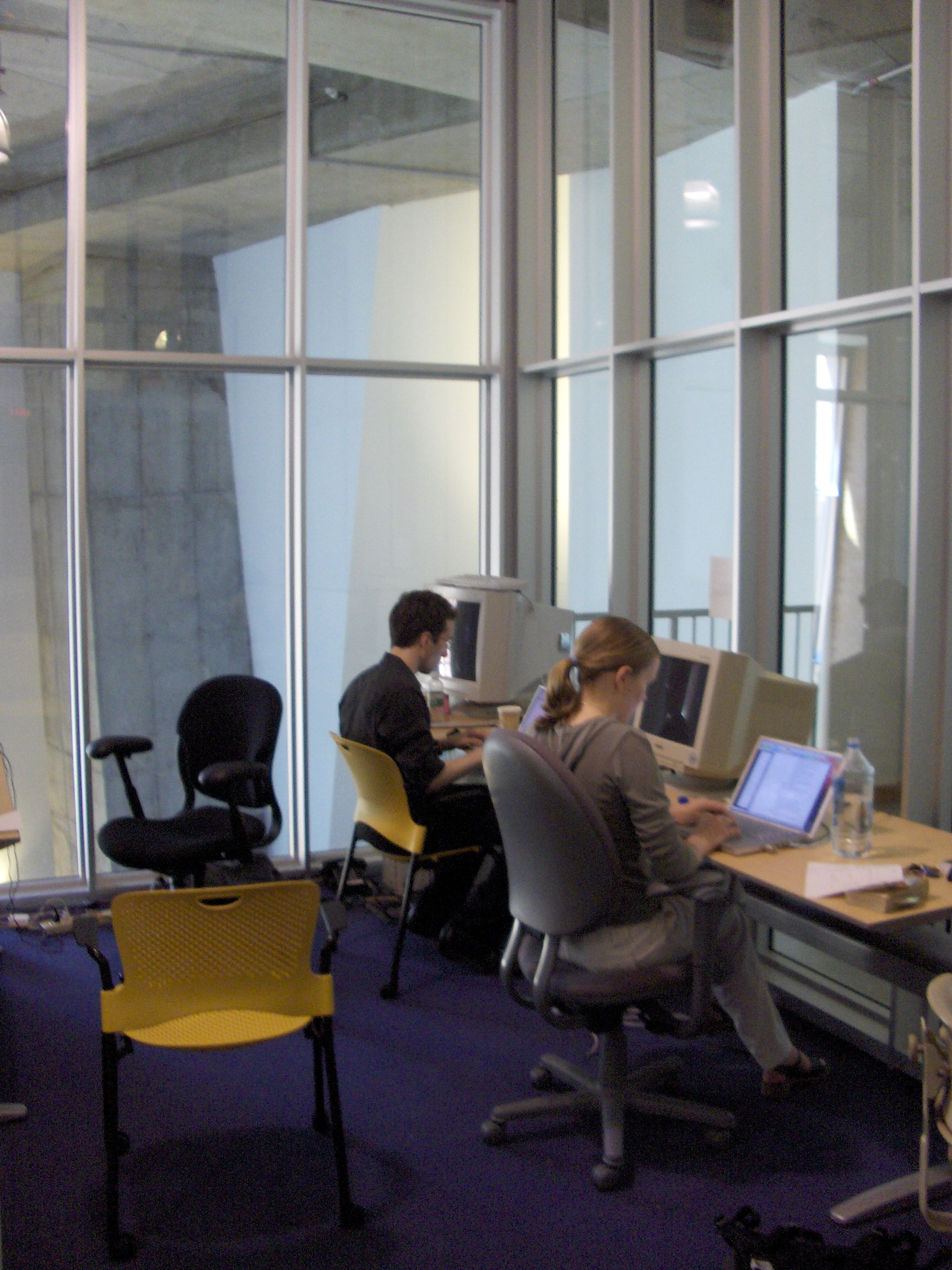
Science Commons office in 2005, MIT Stata Center

Creative Commons launched the Science Commons project in early 2005. The project sought to achieve for science what Creative Commons had achieved for the world of culture, art and educational material: to ease unnecessary legal and technical barriers to sharing, to promote innovation, and to provide easy, high quality tools that let individuals and organizations specify the terms under which they wished to share their material.

In 2009, Creative Commons terminated the Science Commons project.

== Projects ==
=== Biological Materials Transfer Project ===
The Biological Materials Transfer Project, a Material transfer agreement (MTA), developed and deployed standard, modular contracts to lower the costs of transferring biological materials such as DNA, cell lines, model animals and more. The MTA project covered transfer between non-profit institutions, as well as offering transaction solutions to transfers between non-profit entities and for-profit institutions. It integrated existing standard agreements and new Science Commons contracts into a Web-deployed suite, with the goal of developing a transaction system along the lines of Amazon or eBay by using the licensing as a discovery mechanism for materials.

This metadata driven approach is based on the success of the Creative Commons licensing integration into search engines, further allowing for and facilitating the integration of materials licensing into the research literature itself and databases. The hope being that scientists would eventually be only one click away from accessing and/or ordering the materials referenced in the scholarly literature as they perform their research. Unfortunately, the MTA project's tools were not adopted by more than a very small percentage of the scientific community while Science Commons was active and, for all practical purposes, died out when the Science Commons project folded.

=== Neurocommons ===
Science Commons’ Neurocommons project set out to create an Open Source knowledge management platform for biological research. The platform combined open access materials (making up the knowledgebase) and open source software (in the form of an analytic platform). The software was still under development when the project ended.

=== Scholar's Copyright Project ===
The Scholar’s Copyright was developed with Scholarly Publishing and Academic Resources Coalition designed to lower the barriers to Open Access (OA) by reducing transaction costs and eliminating contract proliferation by offering tools and resources catering to both methods of achieving Open Access. The Scholar's Copyright Addendum is still in use by SPARC

==== Open Access Data Protocol ====
The Science Commons Open Access Data Protocol was a method for ensuring that scientific databases can be legally integrated with one another. The protocol was not a license or legal tool, but instead a methodology and best practices document for creating such legal tools in the future, and marking data in the public domain for machine-assisted discovery.
