= Virstatin =

Molecule that inhibits the activity of a cholera protein

Identifiers
- IUPAC name: 4-(N-(1,8-naphthalimide))-n-butyric acid
- CAS Number: 88909-96-0
- PubChem CID: 145949
- ChemSpider: 128749
- UNII: 24SR2Q1Y6M
- ChEMBL: ChEMBL403272
- CompTox Dashboard (EPA): DTXSID10237406

Chemical and physical data
- Formula: C_{16}H_{13}NO_{4}
- Molar mass: 283.283 g·mol^{−1}
- 3D model (JSmol): Interactive image
- Density: 1.40 g/cm^{3}
- Melting point: 180–183 °C (356–361 °F)
- Boiling point: 536.52 °C (997.74 °F)
- SMILES: c1cc2cccc3c2c(c1)C(=O)N(C3=O)CCCC(=O)O
- InChI: InChI=1S/C16H13NO4/c18-13(19)8-3-9-17-15(20)11-6-1-4-10-5-2-7-12(14(10)11)16(17)21/h1-2,4-7H,3,8-9H2,(H,18,19); Key:ZHXRDXTYPCPBTI-UHFFFAOYSA-N

Virstatin is a small molecule that inhibits the activity of the cholera protein, ToxT.

Its activity in cholera was first published in 2005 in a paper that described the screening of a chemical library in a phenotypic screen and subsequent testing of one of the hits in infected mice.

The compound is an isoquinoline alkaloid and can be synthesized by a simple two-step synthesis

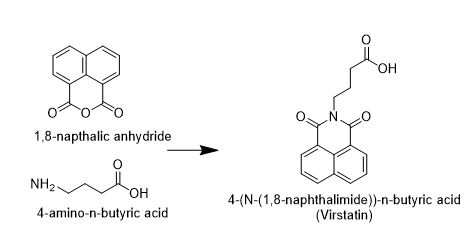
Reaction scheme used in original discovery and analysis of the molecule
