= JChemPaint =

File viewer and editor for chemical structures

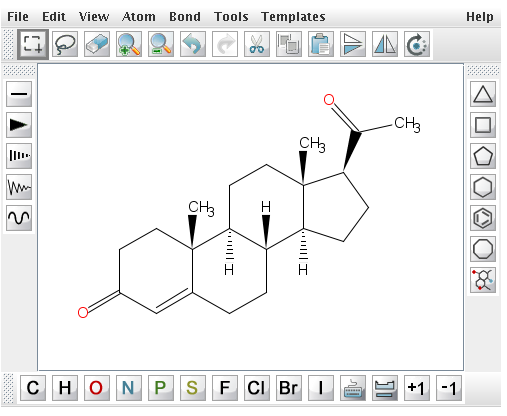
- JChemPaint displays a chemical structural skeletal formula.
- Original author: Christoph Steinbeck
- Developer: The CDK Project
- Initial release: 2000; 26 years ago
- Stable release: 3.3-1210 (September 24, 2012; 13 years ago) [±]
- Preview release: 3.4-beta (March 11, 2025; 13 months ago) [±]
- Written in: Java
- Operating system: Windows, macOS, Linux, Unix
- Platform: Java SE
- Available in: English
- Type: Chemoinformatics
- License: LGPL
- Website: jchempaint.github.io
- Repository: github.com/JChemPaint

JChemPaint is computer software, a molecule editor and file viewer for chemical structures using 2D computer graphics. It is free and open-source software, released under a GNU Lesser General Public License (LGPL). It is written in Java and so can run on the operating systems Windows, macOS, Linux, and Unix. There is a standalone application (editor), and two varieties of applet (editor and viewer) that can be integrated into web pages.

JChemPaint was initiated by Christoph Steinbeck and is currently being developed as part of The Chemistry Development Kit (CDK), and a Standard Widget Toolkit (SWT) based JChemPaint application is being developed, as part of Bioclipse.

== See also ==
- List of molecular graphics systems
- Comparison of software for molecular mechanics modeling
