= Journal of Cheminformatics =

- Discipline: Cheminformatics
- Language: English
- Edited by: Rajarshi Guha, Barbara Zdrazil

Publication details
- History: 2009–present
- Publisher: BioMed Central
- Frequency: Upon acceptance
- Open access: Yes
- License: Creative Commons Attribution
- Impact factor: 7.9 (2025)

Standard abbreviations
- ISO 4: J. Cheminform.

Indexing
- CODEN: JCOHB3
- ISSN: 1758-2946
- OCLC no.: 320093938

Links
- Journal homepage; Online access

The Journal of Cheminformatics is a peer-reviewed open access scientific journal that covers cheminformatics and molecular modelling. It was established in 2009 with David Wild (Indiana University) and Christoph Steinbeck (then at EMBL-EBI) as founding editors-in-chief, and was originally published by Chemistry Central. At the end of 2015, the Chemistry Central brand was retired and its titles, including Journal of Cheminformatics, were merged with the SpringerOpen portfolio of open access journals.

As of 2016, the editors-in-chief are Rajarshi Guha (National Center for Advancing Translational Sciences) and Egon Willighagen (Maastricht University). The journal has issued a few special issues ("article collections") in 2011 and 2012, covering topics like PubChem3D, the Resource Description Framework, and the International Chemical Identifier.

In June 2021 Willighagen announced his intention to step down at the end of the year, explaining in an open letter that the publisher Springer Nature was not sufficiently FAIR and open. Barbara Zdrazil started as editor in chief in 2022. With Rajarshi Guha stepping down at the end of 2025, the current two Editor-in-Chiefs are Barbara Zdrazil and Karina Martínez-Mayorga. Furthermore, the team of associate editors has grown to five editors.

== Abstracting and indexing ==
The journal is abstracted and indexed in:

- Chemical Abstracts Service
- Current Contents/Physical, Chemical & Earth Sciences
- Europe PubMed Central
- OpenAlex
- Science Citation Index Expanded
- Scopus

According to the Journal Citation Reports, the journal has a 2021 impact factor of 8.489. The most cited papers are those on a cross-platform molecule editor and visualizer called Avogadro, which has been cited more than 7400 times and Open Babel, an open source cheminformatics toolkit, cited more than 7600 times, as of April 2026 according to the Web of Science.
