= Chemical library =

Collection of chemicals

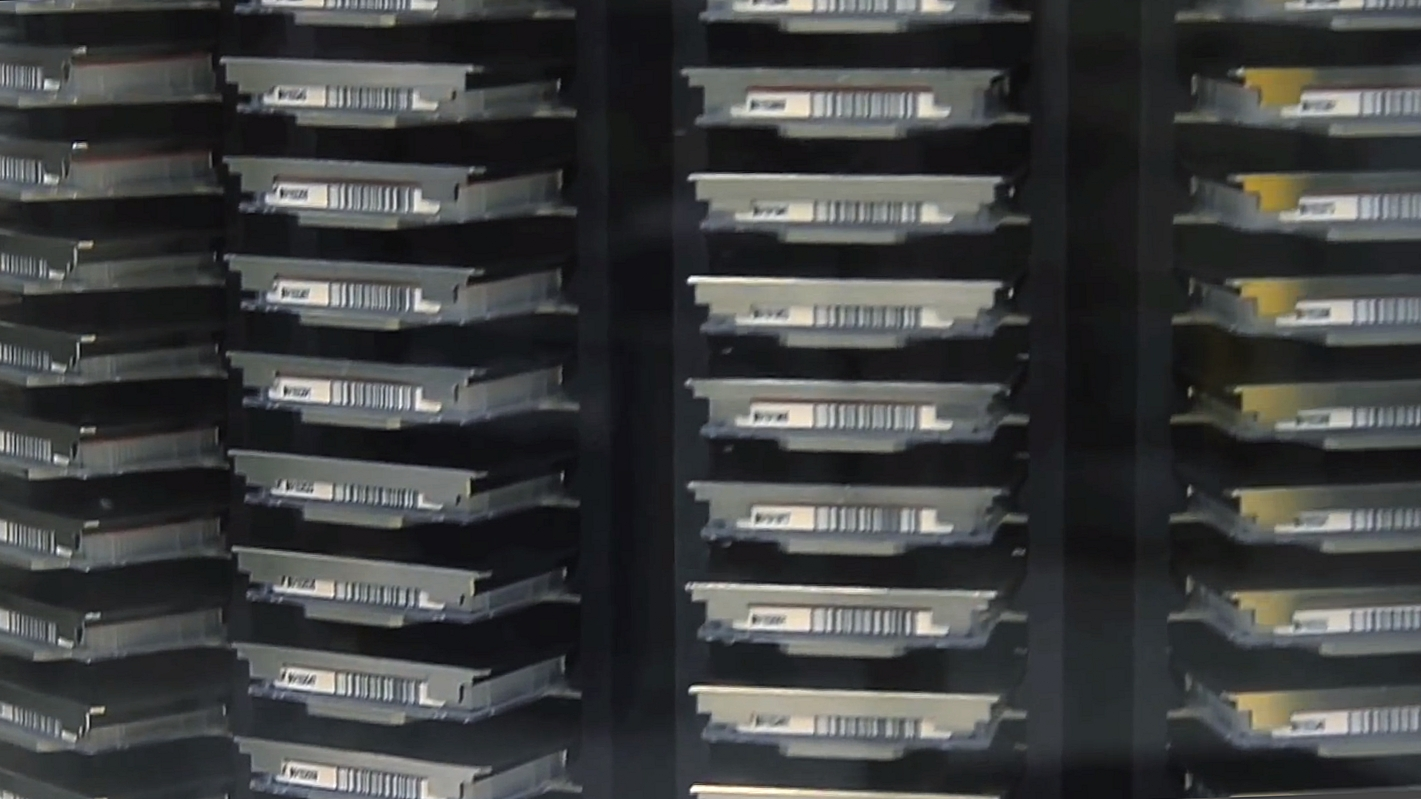
A carousel system to store assay plates used in high-throughput screening process.

A chemical library or compound library is a collection of stored chemicals usually used ultimately in high-throughput screening or industrial manufacture. The chemical library can consist in simple terms of a series of stored chemicals. Each chemical has associated information stored in some kind of database with information such as the chemical structure, purity, quantity, and physiochemical characteristics of the compound.

== Purpose ==
In drug discovery high-throughput screening, it is desirable to screen a drug target against a selection of chemicals that try to take advantage of as much of the appropriate chemical space as possible. The chemical space of all possible chemical structures is extraordinarily large. Most stored chemical libraries do not typically have a fully represented or sampled chemical space mostly because of storage and cost concerns. However, since many molecular interactions cannot be predicted, the wider the chemical space that is sampled by the chemical library, the better the chance that high-throughput screening will find a "hit"—a chemical with an appropriate interaction in a biological model that might be developed into a drug.

An example of a chemical library in drug discovery would be a series of chemicals known to inhibit kinases, or in industrial processes, a series of catalysts known to polymerize resins.

== Generation of chemical libraries ==
Chemical libraries are usually generated for a specific goal and larger chemical libraries could be made of several groups of smaller libraries stored in the same location. In the drug discovery process for instance, a wide range of organic chemicals are needed to test against models of disease in high-throughput screening. Therefore, most of the chemical synthesis needed to generate chemical libraries in drug discovery is based on organic chemistry. A company that is interested in screening for kinase inhibitors in cancer may limit their chemical libraries and synthesis to just those types of chemicals known to have affinity for ATP binding sites or allosteric sites.

Generally, however, most chemical libraries focus on large groups of varied organic chemical series where an organic chemist can make many variations on the same molecular scaffold or molecular backbone. Sometimes chemicals can be purchased from outside vendors as well and included into an internal chemical library.

Depending upon their scope and design, chemical libraries can also be classified as diverse oriented, Drug-like, Lead-like, peptide-mimetic, Natural Product-like, Targeted against a specific family of biological targets such Kinases, GPCRs, Proteases, PPI etc. These chemical libraries are often used in target based drug discovery (reverse pharmacology). Among the compound libraries should be annotated the Fragment Compound Libraries, which are mainly used for Fragment-based lead discovery.

== Design and optimization of chemical libraries ==
Chemical libraries are usually designed by chemists and chemoinformatics scientists and synthesized by organic chemistry and medicinal chemistry. The method of chemical library generation usually depends on the project and there are many factors to consider when using rational methods to select screening compounds. Typically, a range of chemicals is screened against a particular drug target or disease model, and the preliminary "hits", or chemicals that show the desired activity, are re-screened to verify their activity. Once they are qualified as a "hit" by their repeatability and activity, these particular chemicals are registered and analysed. Chemoproteomics is a field of study that incorporates the use of chemical libraries to identify protein targets. Commonalities among the different chemical groups are studied as they are often reflective of a particular chemical subspace. Additional chemistry work may be needed to further optimize the chemical library in the active portion of the subspace. When it is needed, more synthesis is completed to extend out the chemical library in that particular subspace by generating more compounds that are very similar to the original hits. This new selection of compounds within this narrow range are further screened and then taken on to more sophisticated models for further validation in the Drug Discovery Hit to Lead process.

== Storage and management ==
The "chemical space" of all possible organic chemicals is large and increases exponentially with the size of the molecule. Most chemical libraries do not typically have a fully represented chemical space mostly because of storage and cost concerns.

Because of the expense and effort involved in chemical synthesis, the chemicals must be correctly stored and banked away for later use to prevent early degradation. Each chemical has a particular shelf life and storage requirement and in a good-sized chemical library, there is a timetable by which library chemicals are disposed of and replaced on a regular basis. Some chemicals are fairly unstable, radioactive, volatile or flammable and must be stored under careful conditions in accordance with safety standards such as OSHA.

Most chemical libraries are managed with information technologies such as barcoding and relational databases. Additionally, robotics are necessary to fetch compounds in larger chemical libraries.

Because a chemical library's individual entries can easily reach up into the millions of compounds, the management of even modest-sized chemical libraries can be a full-time endeavor. Compound management is one such field that attempts to manage and upkeep these chemical libraries as well as maximizing safety and effectiveness in their management.

== See also ==
- Compound management
- Druglikeness
- Lead compound
- Scientific collection
- Chemoproteomics
