= Chemistry Central =

Open access publisher

- Parent company: Springer Science+Business Media
- Status: Defunct (2015)
- Founded: August 22, 2006
- Distribution: Open access
- Publication types: Scientific journals
- Nonfiction topics: Chemistry
- Official website: www.chemistrycentral.com

Chemistry Central was a scientific publisher specializing in open access publications in chemistry. It was established on August 22, 2006 and was operated by BioMed Central. Along with BioMed Central and the now-defunct PhysMath Central, Chemistry Central was part of "Open Access Central", representing open access publishing in life science and medicine, physics and maths, and chemistry, respectively. When Springer acquired the BioMed Central Group in 2008, Chemistry Central was transferred with it.

At the end of 2015 the Chemistry Central brand was retired, with the existing journals transferring to the SpringerOpen portfolio. In January 2019, Chemistry Central Journal was renamed BMC Chemistry and brought within the BMC Series journals.

== Publications ==
- Journal of Cheminformatics
- Chemistry Central Journal
- Journal of Systems Chemistry
- Geochemical Transactions
- Heritage Science
- Sustainable Chemical Processes
- Chemical and Biological Technologies in Agriculture
