= Christoph Steinbeck =

German chemist (born 1966)

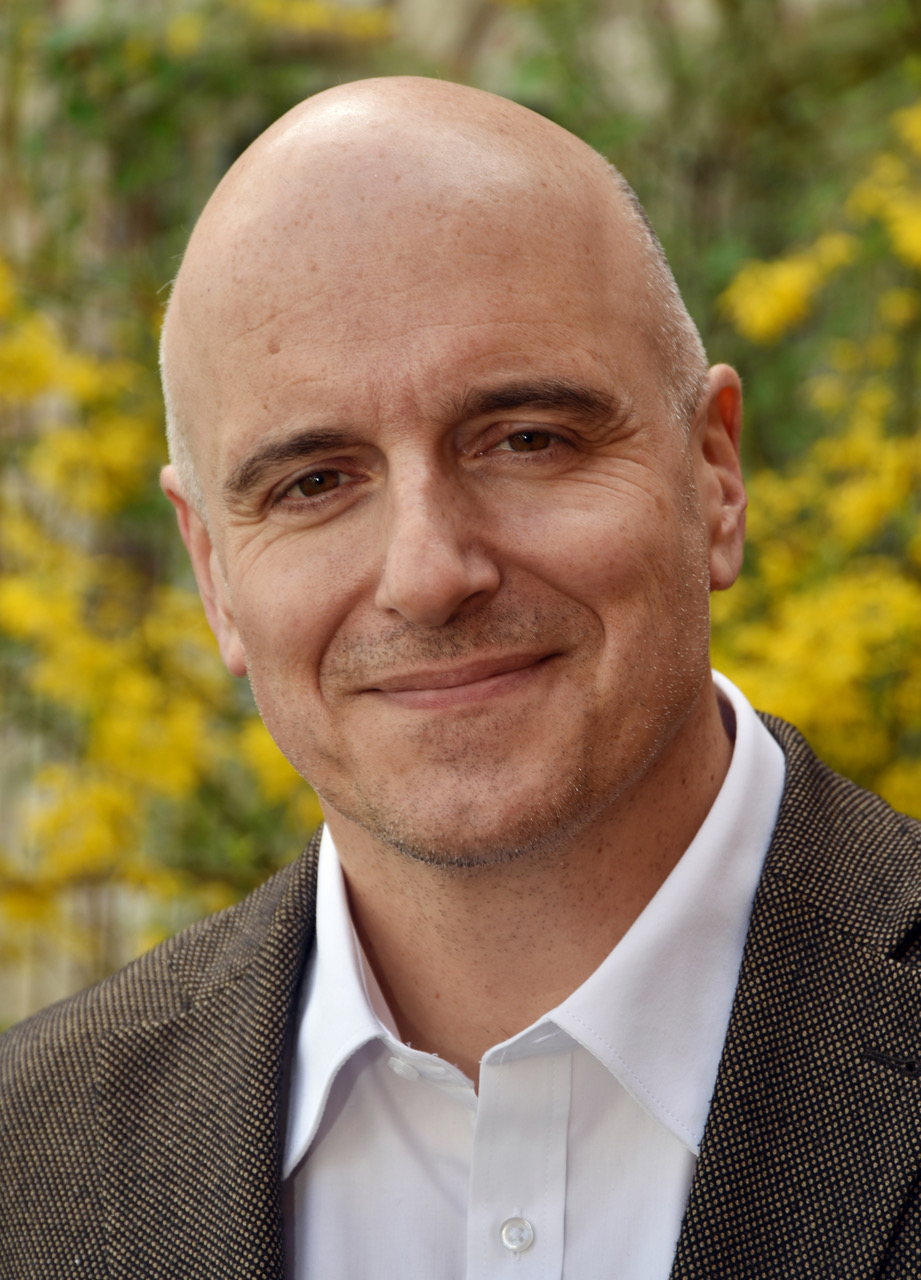
- Born: 1966 (age 59–60); Neuwied, Germany
- Education: University of Bonn
- Known for: Chemistry Development Kit; Journal of Cheminformatics; JChemPaint; ChEBI
- Awards: Blue Obelisk award
- Scientific career
- Fields: Cheminformatics; Bioinformatics; Metabolism
- Workplaces: Friedrich-Schiller-Universität Jena; EMBL-EBI; Tufts University; Max Planck Institute for Chemical Ecology; Cologne University; University of Bonn
- Thesis: LUCY, ein Programm zur Konstitutionsbestimmung aus Korrelations-NMR-Experimenten sowie Beispiele zur Identifizierung von Naturstoffen durch NMR-Spektroskopie (1995)
- Website: steinbeck-molecular.de

Christoph Steinbeck (born 1966 in Neuwied) is a German chemist and has a professorship for analytical chemistry, cheminformatics and chemometrics at the Friedrich-Schiller-Universität Jena in Thuringia.

== Education ==
Steinbeck received his PhD from the University of Bonn in 1995 for work on LUCY, a software program for structural elucidation from nuclear magnetic resonance (NMR) correlation experiments. In 2003 he received his habilitation.

== Research ==
Steinbeck's research interests have involved the elucidation of chemical structures of metabolites. He was one of the first chemists to develop open source tools for cheminformatics. He initiated JChemPaint, was founder of the Chemistry Development Kit, and is responsible for leading the team working on Chemical Entities of Biological Interest (ChEBI). He headed the Cheminformatics and Metabolomics group at the European Molecular Biology Laboratory-European Bioinformatics Institute in Cambridge, United Kingdom from 2008 to 2016. He became a professor for analytical chemistry, cheminformatics and chemometrics at the Friedrich-Schiller-Universität Jena in Thuringia, Germany in March 2017. Since 2020, Steinbeck is leading the German National Research Data Infrastructure for Chemistry (NFDI4Chem) and in August 2022, he became vice President for digitalisation of the Friedrich Schiller University. Together with a few other chemists he was a founder member of the Blue Obelisk movement in 2005.

Steinbeck was past editor-in-chief of the Journal of Cheminformatics, past director of the Metabolomics Society, past chair of the Computers-Information-Chemistry division of the German Chemical Society, past trustee of the Chemical Structure Association Trust, and a lifetime member of the World Association of Theoretically Oriented Chemists.
