= Compound management =

Compound management in the field of drug discovery refers to the systematic collection, storage, retrieval, and quality control of small molecule chemical compounds used in high-throughput screening and other research activities to identify hits that can be developed into candidate drugs.

Drug discovery depends on methods by which many different chemicals are assayed for their activity. These chemicals are stored as physical quantities in a chemical library or libraries which are often assembled from both outside vendors and internal chemical synthesis efforts. These chemical libraries are used in high-throughput screening in the drug discovery hit to lead process.

The chemical libraries in larger pharmaceutical companies are a critical part of the discovery process. These chemicals are stored in environmentally controlled conditions in small or large containers, often labeled with codes that pass back into a database. Each chemical in the storage bank must be monitored for shelf life, quantity, purity and other parameters, and its banked location. In some companies, the compounds can also include biological compounds, such as purified proteins or nucleic acids. The management of these chemical libraries, including renewal of outdated chemicals, databases containing the information, robotics often involved in fetching chemicals, and quality control of the storage environment is called Compound Management or Compound Control. Compound Management is often a significant expense, as well as career for one or more individuals who manage a chemical library at a research site.

There are many books and journal articles devoted entirely or in part to compound management. It has become a critical technological component for high-throughput screening and chemical genomics. There are great challenges to be faced in the necessity of compound management, which are being surmounted by concerted efforts in the public and private domain. In 2008, authors at the National Institutes of Health's Chemical Genomics Center have released a paper showing the necessity of a highly automated, reliable and parallel compound management platform, in order to serve over 200,000 different compounds.

In short, Compound Management requires inventory control of small molecules and biologics needed for assays and experiments, especially in high-throughput screening. It utilizes knowledge of chemistry, robotics, biology, and database management. The manager must also be acutely aware of safety standards in the handling and storing of radioactive, volatile, flammable and unstable compounds. Often, in large pharmaceutical companies, the chemical and biological compounds contained in compound libraries can number in the millions, making compound management and compound control important contributors to research and drug discovery.

== Outsourcing ==
Because of the significant expenses and infrastructure required for accurate compound management (space requirements, robotics, IT support, analytical support, etc.) many companies choose to outsource this function to a company that specializes in this arena. It is important to work with a company that has significant experience in compound management due to the complexity of tracking not only inventory data, but also compound location, storage conditions, and compound integrity. This experience also is of paramount importance when knowing how to appropriately deal with the wide array of materials handled including, solids, liquids, volatile materials, sticky solids, oils, and gums as well as hazardous, flammable, hygroscopic and toxic compounds.

Customers can specify not only the quantity of material but also the exact vial and cap or plate for their specific application. The service provides enormous savings from a time perspective as researchers do not spend their valuable time on weighing hundreds of compounds or getting them into the correct format for their assay. It also dramatically reduces disposal costs since the exact amount of material required can be ordered rather than needing to order e.g. 100 g of material when only 0.1 g is needed for the experiment.

The high throughput analytical chemistry component of the company allows rapid validation that compounds are the correct material at the desired purity. While controlled storage conditions minimize degradation, customers may use this service to validate that the material they sent to outsourcing partner originally was correct and pure. Subsequently the service allows re-evaluation of compounds that may have decomposed during long term storage. The purification services complement the analytical services by allowing cost effective, environmentally friendly recovery of partially degraded reactive intermediates and HTS compounds at a fraction of the cost of synthesizing or purchasing these materials.

== Conferences ==
There are several conferences related to compound management. The best known is Compound Management & Integrity although many chemistry and pharmaceutical conferences include talks or specific sections on the topic.
