= Panton Principles =

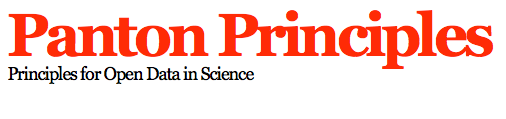

The Panton Principles are a set of principles which were written to promote open science. They were first drafted in July 2009 at the Panton Arms pub in Cambridge.

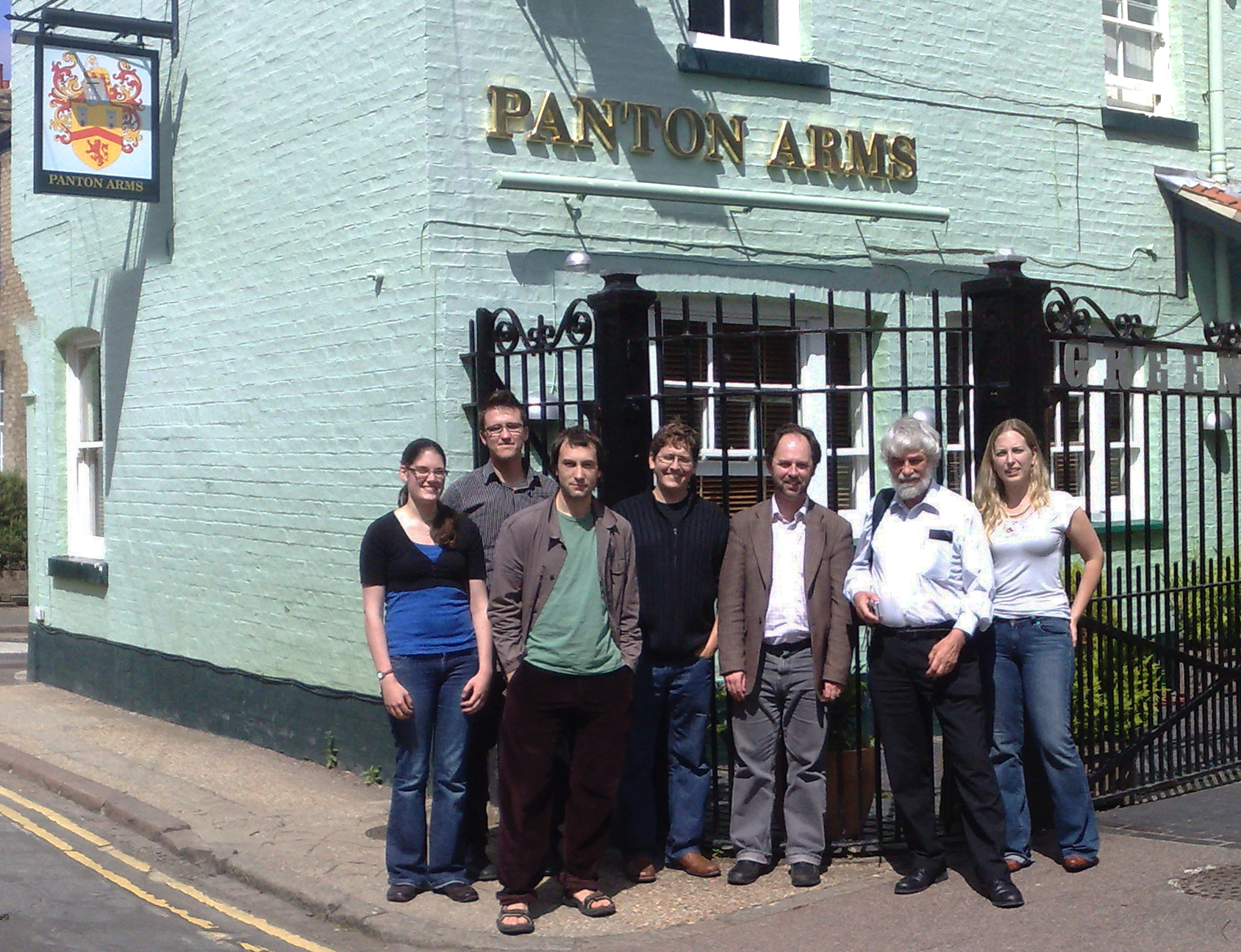
Drafters of the Panton Principles at the Panton Arms pub

== History ==
The principles were written by Peter Murray-Rust, Cameron Neylon, Rufus Pollock, and John Wilbanks. They were then refined by the Open Knowledge Foundation and officially launched in February 2010.

== The Principles ==
1. Where data or collections of data are published it is critical that they be published with a clear and explicit statement of the wishes and expectations of the publishers concerning the re-use and re-purposing of individual data elements, the whole data collection, and subsets of the collection. This statement should be precise, irrevocable, and based on an appropriate and recognized legal statement in the form of a waiver or license.

When publishing data make an explicit and robust statement of your wishes.

2. Many widely recognized licenses are not intended for, and are not appropriate for, data or collections of data. A variety of waivers and licenses that are designed for and appropriate for the treatment of data are described here. Creative Commons licenses (apart from CCZero), GFDL, GPL, BSD, etc. are NOT appropriate for data and their use is STRONGLY discouraged.

Use a recognized waiver or license that is appropriate for data.

3. The use of licenses which limit commercial re-use or limit the production of derivative works by excluding use for particular purposes or by specific persons or organizations is STRONGLY discouraged. These licenses make it impossible to effectively integrate and re-purpose datasets and prevent commercial activities that could be used to support data preservation.

If you want your data to be effectively used and added to by others it should be open as defined by the Open Knowledge/Data Definition – in particular non-commercial and other restrictive clauses should not be used.

4. Furthermore, in science it is STRONGLY recommended that data, especially where publicly funded, be explicitly placed in the public domain via the use of the Public Domain Dedication and Licence or Creative Commons Zero Waiver. This is in keeping with the public funding of much scientific research and the general ethos of sharing and re-use within the scientific community.

Explicit dedication of data underlying published science into the public domain via PDDL or CCZero is strongly recommended and ensures compliance with both the Science Commons Protocol for Implementing Open Access Data and the Open Knowledge/Data Definition.

== Response ==
Between the launch of the project and December 2011 the principles gained 150 endorsements from researchers.

One researcher said the principles allow researchers to better claim credit for their work.

The project won an innovation prize from the Scholarly Publishing and Academic Resources Coalition.
