= Cameron Neylon =

Australian biophysicist & activist

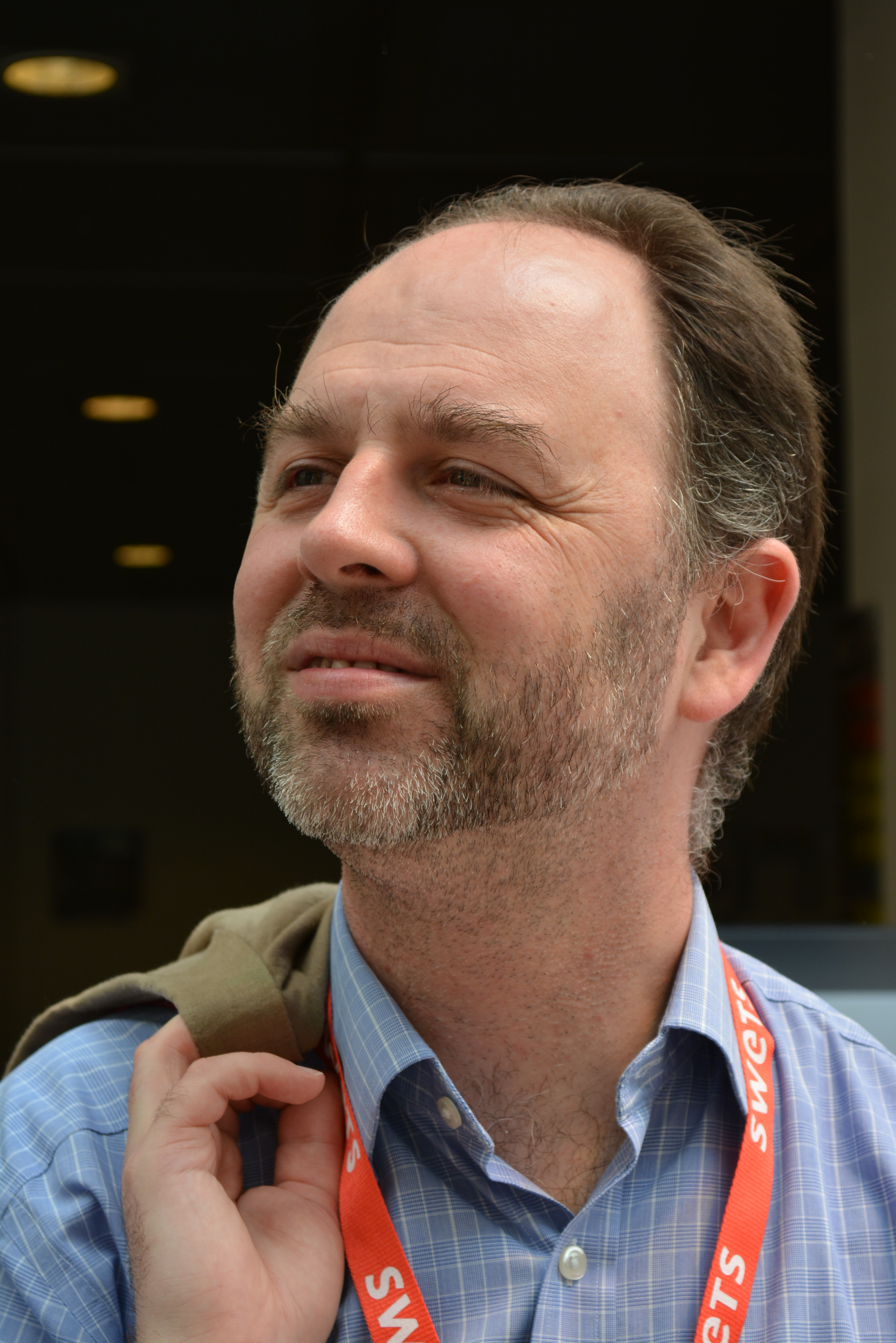
- Cameron Neylon in 2013
- Born: David Cameron Neylon
- Education: University of Western Australia (BSc); Australian National University (PhD)
- Known for: Panton Principles; Beautiful Data
- Awards: Blue Obelisk award (2010)
- Scientific career
- Fields: Biophysics; Data management; Open research
- Workplaces: Curtin University; Public Library of Science (PLOS); Flooved; ISIS neutron source; STFC
- Thesis: Towards the directed molecular evolution of DNA-binding specificity (1999)
- Neylon's voice recorded May 2017
- Website: cameronneylon.net

David Cameron Neylon is an advocate for open access and Professor of Research Communications at the Centre for Culture and Technology at Curtin University. From 2012 to 2015 they were the Advocacy Director at the Public Library of Science.

== Education ==
Neylon was educated at the University of Western Australia and the Australian National University where they were awarded a Doctor of Philosophy degree in Biophysics in 1999 for work on directed molecular evolution and DNA-binding specificity.

== Career ==
In 2009 Neylon was a senior scientist at the ISIS neutron source of the Science and Technology Facilities Council. From 2012 to 2015 they served as director of advocacy at the Public Library of Science. They joined The Centre for Culture and Technology (CCAT) at Curtin University in 2015 as Professor of Research Communications.

Neylon is an original drafter of the Panton Principles and opposed the Research Works Act and advocates for governmental encouragement for researchers to use open access licensing.

Neylon advocates for the use of altmetrics in determining the impact of scholarly publications.

== Awards and honours ==
In 2010 they accepted a Blue Obelisk award.
