= Yusuf Hamied Department of Chemistry =

Department at the University of Cambridge

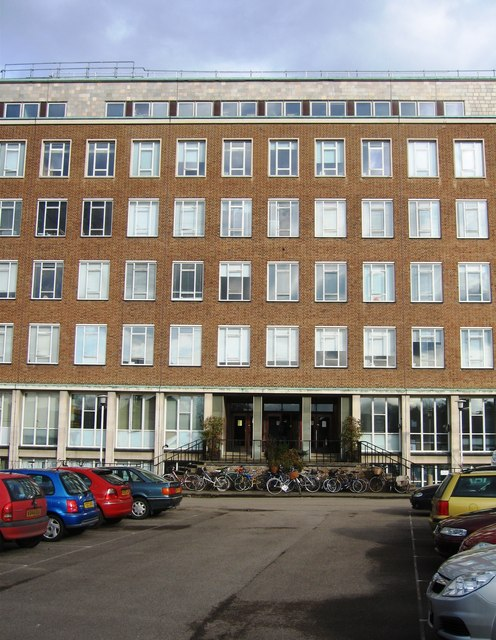
- The main entrance of the Chemistry Department in Cambridge
- Head of Department: James Keeler
- Academic staff: 60
- Location: Cambridge, United Kingdom
- Website: www.ch.cam.ac.uk

The Yusuf Hamied Department of Chemistry is the University of Cambridge's chemistry department. It is located on the Lensfield Road, next to the Panton Arms on the south side of Cambridge. It was formed from a merger in the early 1980s of two separate departments that had moved into the Lensfield Road building decades earlier. The Department of Physical Chemistry had been originally led by Professor Ronald Norrish FRS, Nobel laureate, and was located near the Old Cavendish in Free School Lane (see photo). The Department of Chemistry included theoretical chemistry, and was led by Lord (Alexander) Todd FRS, Nobel laureate.

Research interests in the department cover a broad of chemistry ranging from molecular biology to geophysics.

In December 2020, it was renamed for 30 years in recognition of a donation from Dr Yusuf Hamied, an alumnus of the department.

== Research ==
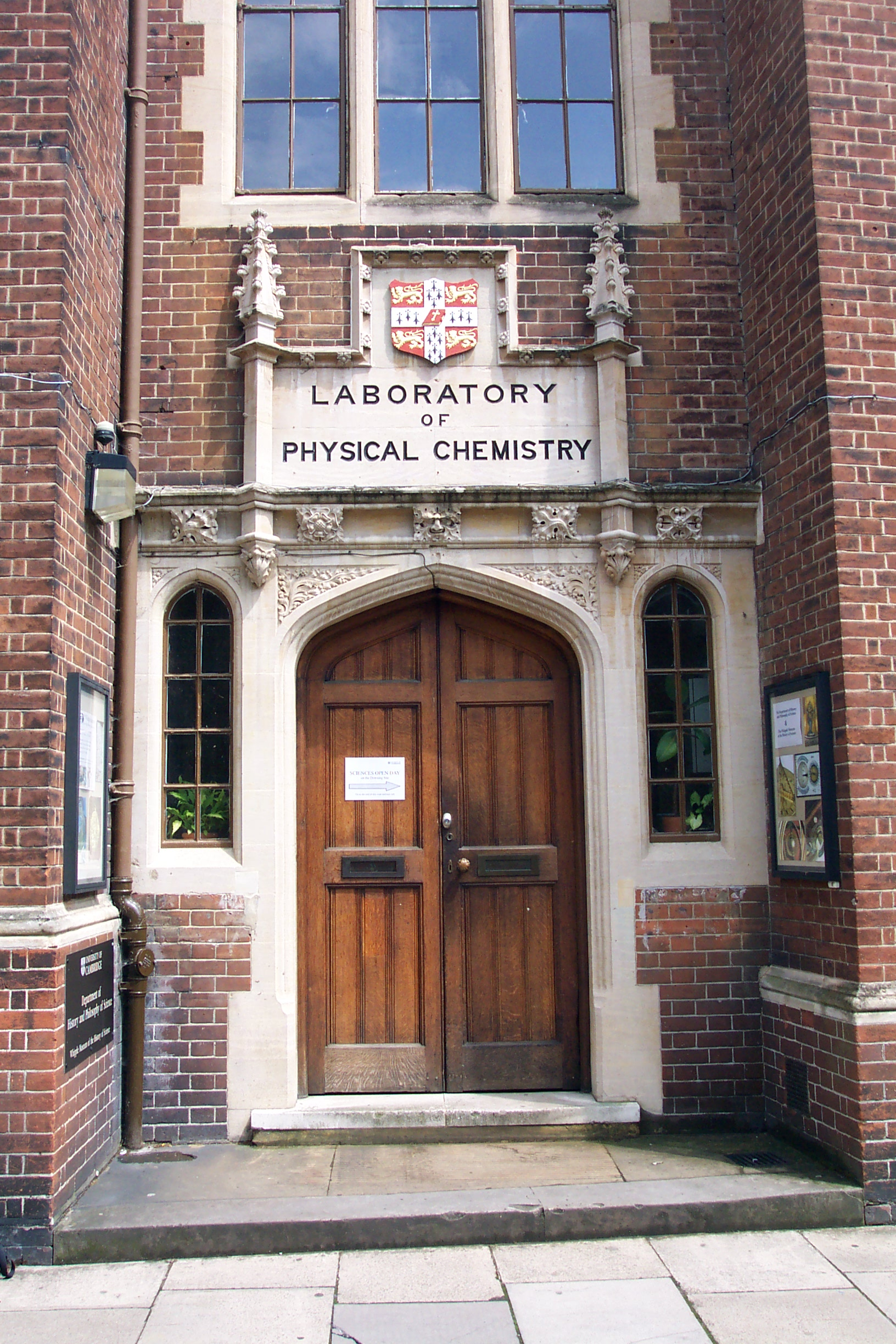
Old Physical Chemistry Laboratory, Cambridge

The department's research is organised around five Research Interest Groups (RIGs):

- Biological Chemistry
- Materials Chemistry
- Physical and Atmospheric Chemistry
- Synthetic Chemistry
- Theory

In addition, the Chemistry of Health Building houses the Centre for Misfolding Diseases, the Chemistry of Health Incubator and the Molecular Production and Characterisation Centre (MPACC)
