= Q-RASAR =

Statistical modeling technology

The quantitative Read-Across Structure-Activity Relationship (q-RASAR) concept has been developed by the DTC Laboratory, Jadavpur University by merging Read-Across and QSAR. It is a statistical modeling approach that uses the similarity and error-based measures as descriptors in addition to the usual structural and physicochemical descriptors, and it has been shown to enhance the external predictivity of QSAR/QSPR models.

The novel quantitative read-across structure-activity relationship (q-RASAR) approach combines the advantages of both QSAR and read-across, thus resulting in enhanced predictivity for the same level of chemical information used. This approach utilizes similarity-based considerations yet can generate simple, interpretable, and transferable models. This approach may be used for any type of structural and physicochemical descriptors and with any modeling algorithms.

The q-RASAR approach has been used by different research groups for different endpoints. Among different RASAR descriptors, RA function, Average Similarity and gm (Banerjee-Roy concordance coefficient) have shown high importance in modeling in some studies. In 2023, Banerjee-Roy similarity coefficients sm1 and sm2 have also been proposed to identify potential activity cliffs in a data set. The q-RASAR approach has the potential in data gap filling in predictive toxicology, materials science, medicinal chemistry, food sciences, nano-sciences, agricultural sciences, etc.

A tutorial presentation on q-RASAR is available. Recently, the q-RASAR framework has been improved by its integration with the ARKA descriptors in QSAR.
