= Molecule mining =

Data mining for patterns in molecule data

Molecule mining is the process of data mining, or extracting and discovering patterns, as applied to molecules. Since molecules may be represented by molecular graphs, this is strongly related to graph mining and structured data mining. The main problem is how to represent molecules while discriminating the data instances. One way to do this is chemical similarity metrics, which has a long tradition in the field of cheminformatics.

Typical approaches to calculate chemical similarities use chemical fingerprints, but this loses the underlying information about the molecule topology. Mining the molecular graphs directly avoids this problem. So does the inverse QSAR problem which is preferable for vectorial mappings.

== Coding(Molecule_{i},Molecule_{j≠i}) ==
=== Kernel methods ===
- Marginalized graph kernel
- Optimal assignment kernel
- Pharmacophore kernel
- C++ (and R) implementation combining
  - the marginalized graph kernel between labeled graphs
  - extensions of the marginalized kernel
  - Tanimoto kernels
  - graph kernels based on tree patterns
  - kernels based on pharmacophores for 3D structure of molecules

=== Maximum common graph methods ===
- MCS-HSCS (Highest Scoring Common Substructure (HSCS) ranking strategy for single MCS)
- Small Molecule Subgraph Detector (SMSD)- is a Java-based software library for calculating Maximum Common Subgraph (MCS) between small molecules. This will help us to find similarity/distance between two molecules. MCS is also used for screening drug like compounds by hitting molecules, which share common subgraph (substructure).

== Coding(Molecule_{i}) ==
=== Molecular query methods ===
- Warmr
- AGM
- PolyFARM
- FSG
- MolFea
- MoFa/MoSS
- Gaston
- LAZAR
- ParMol (contains MoFa, FFSM, gSpan, and Gaston)
- optimized gSpan
- SMIREP
- DMax
- SAm/AIm/RHC
- AFGen
- gRed
- G-Hash

=== Methods based on special architectures of neural networks ===
- BPZ
- ChemNet
- CCS
- MolNet
- Graph machines

== See also ==
- Molecular Query Language
- Chemical graph theory
- Chemical space
- QSAR
- ADME
- partition coefficient
