= Chemical space =

Concept in cheminformatics

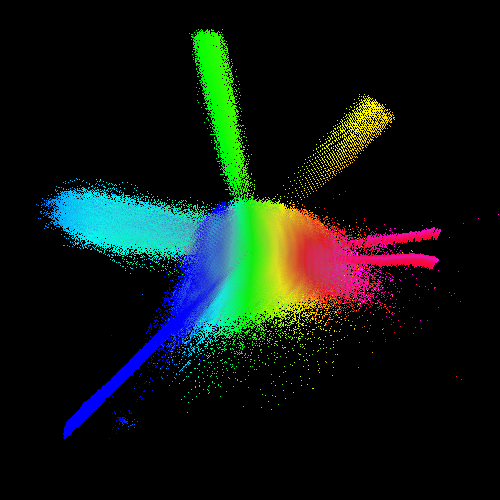
View of PubChem chemical space; a projection of the 42-dimensional molecular quantum numbers (MQN) properties of compounds in PubChem (5 virtually created libraries of compounds) using PCA. Color coding is according to fraction of ring atoms in molecules (blue 0, red 1).

Chemical space is a concept in cheminformatics referring to the property space spanned by all possible molecules and chemical compounds adhering to a given set of construction principles and boundary conditions. It contains millions of compounds which are readily accessible and available to researchers. It is a library used in the method of molecular docking.

== Theoretical spaces ==
A chemical space often referred to in cheminformatics is that of potential pharmacologically active molecules. Its size is estimated to be in the order of 10^{60} molecules. There are no rigorous methods for determining the precise size of this space. The assumptions used for estimating the number of potential pharmacologically active molecules, however, use the Lipinski rules, in particular the molecular weight limit of 500. The estimate also restricts the chemical elements used to be Carbon, Hydrogen, Oxygen, Nitrogen and Sulfur. It further makes the assumption of a maximum of 30 atoms to stay below 500 daltons, allows for branching and a maximum of 4 rings and arrives at an estimate of 10^{63}. This number is often misquoted in subsequent publications to be the estimated size of the whole organic chemistry space, which would be much larger if including the halogens and other elements. In addition to the drug-like space and lead-like space that are, in part, defined by the Lipinski's rule of five, the concept of known drug space (KDS), which is defined by the molecular descriptors of marketed drugs, has also been introduced. KDS can be used to help predict the boundaries of chemical spaces for drug development by comparing the structure of the molecules that are undergoing design and synthesis to the molecular descriptor parameters that are defined by the KDS.

== Empirical spaces ==
As of October 2024, 219 million molecules were assigned with a Chemical Abstracts Service (CAS) Registry Number. ChEMBL Database version 33 record biological activities for 2,431,025 distinct molecules. Chemical libraries used for laboratory-based screening for compounds with desired properties are examples for real-world chemical libraries of small size (a few hundred to hundreds of thousands of molecules).

== Generation ==
Systematic exploration of chemical space is possible by creating in silico databases of virtual molecules, which can be visualized by projecting multidimensional property space of molecules in lower dimensions. Generation of chemical spaces may involve creating stoichiometric combinations of electrons and atomic nuclei to yield all possible topology isomers for the given construction principles. In Cheminformatics, software programs called Structure Generators are used to generate the set of all chemical structure adhering to given boundary conditions. Constitutional Isomer Generators, for example, can generate all possible constitutional isomers of a given molecular gross formula.

In the real world, chemical reactions allow us to move in chemical space. The mapping between chemical space and molecular properties is often not unique, meaning that there can be very different molecules exhibiting very similar properties. Materials design and drug discovery both involve the exploration of chemical space.

== See also ==
- Cheminformatics
- Drug design
- Sequence space (evolution)
- Molecule mining
