= Bioclipse =

Java-based, open-source, visual platform for chemo- and bioinformatics

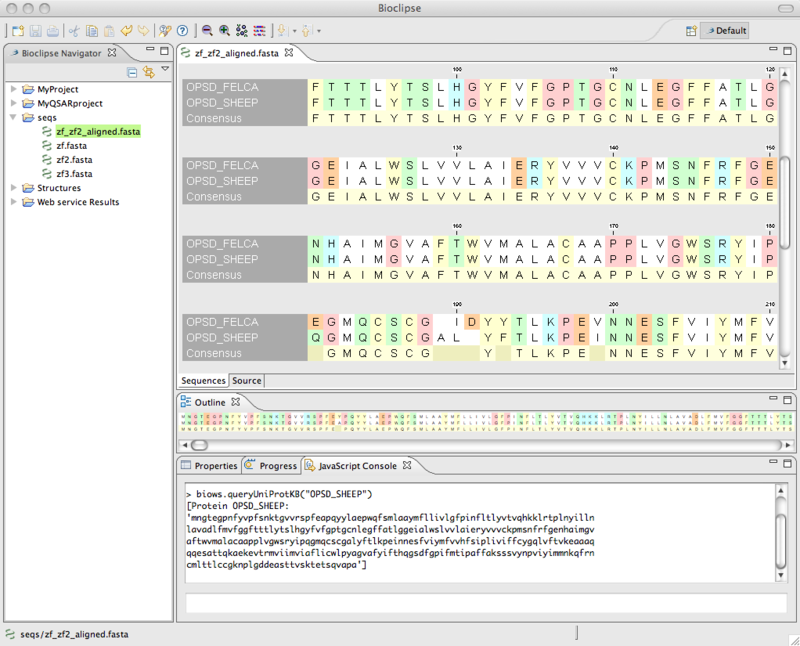
- Developer: The Bioclipse Project
- Initial release: 17 November 2005; 20 years ago
- Stable release: 2.6.2 (November 4, 2016; 9 years ago) [±]
- Preview release: 2.6.2 RC (April 15, 2016) [±]
- Type: Cheminformatics, bioinformatics
- License: Eclipse Public License
- Website: www.bioclipse.net

The Bioclipse project is a Java-based, open-source, visual platform for chemo- and bioinformatics based on the Eclipse Rich Client Platform (RCP).

== About ==
Bioclipse gained scripting functionality in 2009, and a command line version in 2021.

Like any RCP application, Bioclipse uses a plugin architecture that inherits basic functionality and visual interfaces from Eclipse, such as help system, software updates, preferences, cross-platform deployment etc. Via its plugins, Bioclipse provides functionality for chemo- and bioinformatics, and extension points that easily can be extended by other, possibly proprietary, plugins to provide additional functionality.

=== Product ===
The first stable release of Bioclipse includes a Chemistry Development Kit (CDK) plugin to provide a chemoinformatic backend, a Jmol plugin for 3D-visualization of molecules, and a BioJava plugin for sequence analysis. Recently, the R platform, using StatET, and OpenTox were added.

Bioclipse is developed as a collaboration between the Proteochemometric Group, Dept. of Pharmaceutical Biosciences, Uppsala University, Sweden, the Christoph Steinbeck Group at the European Bioinformatics Institute, and the Analytical Chemistry Department at Leiden University, but also includes extensions developed at other academic institutes, including the Karolinska Institutet and Maastricht University. The development is backed up by the International Bioclipse Association.

=== Bioclipse Scripting Language ===
The Bioclipse Scripting Language (BSL) is a scripting environment, currently based on JavaScript and Groovy. It extends the scripting language with managers that wrap the functionality of third party libraries, as mentioned above. These scripts thus provide means to make analyses in Bioclipse sharable, for example, on MyExperiment.org. Bioclipse defines a number of core data types that managers support, allowing information to be used between these managers.
