= Panton Arms =

Pub in Cambridge, England

Coordinates: 52.196°N 0.125°E

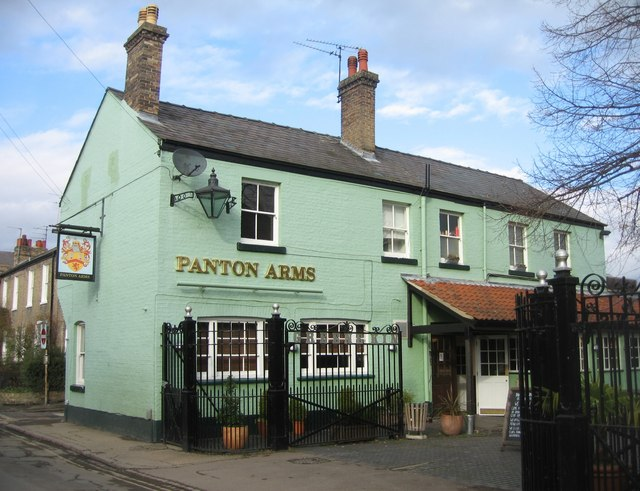
The Panton Arms pub in Panton Street, Cambridge.

The Panton Arms is a pub in Cambridge, in the county of Cambridgeshire, England that is often frequented by scientists from the Engineering and Chemistry Department of the University of Cambridge. It became more widely known in February 2010 when a group of scientists released the Panton Principles — a set of recommendations on how to license and label scientific data that have been made public — that they had drafted in the Panton Arms starting in June 2009.

The pub features a "white gingerbread building festooned with hanging baskets of petunias and nestled among rows of Victorian terraced houses" with black wrought iron gates. The atmosphere, service and the food at the pub have generated mixed reviews from online reviewers. It serves beer and there is adequate parking nearby. One reviewer described how it seemed "hidden in a residential area". It is the remaining corner and former tap room of a larger site, originally occupied by a brewery.
