= John Wilbanks =

American entrepreneur

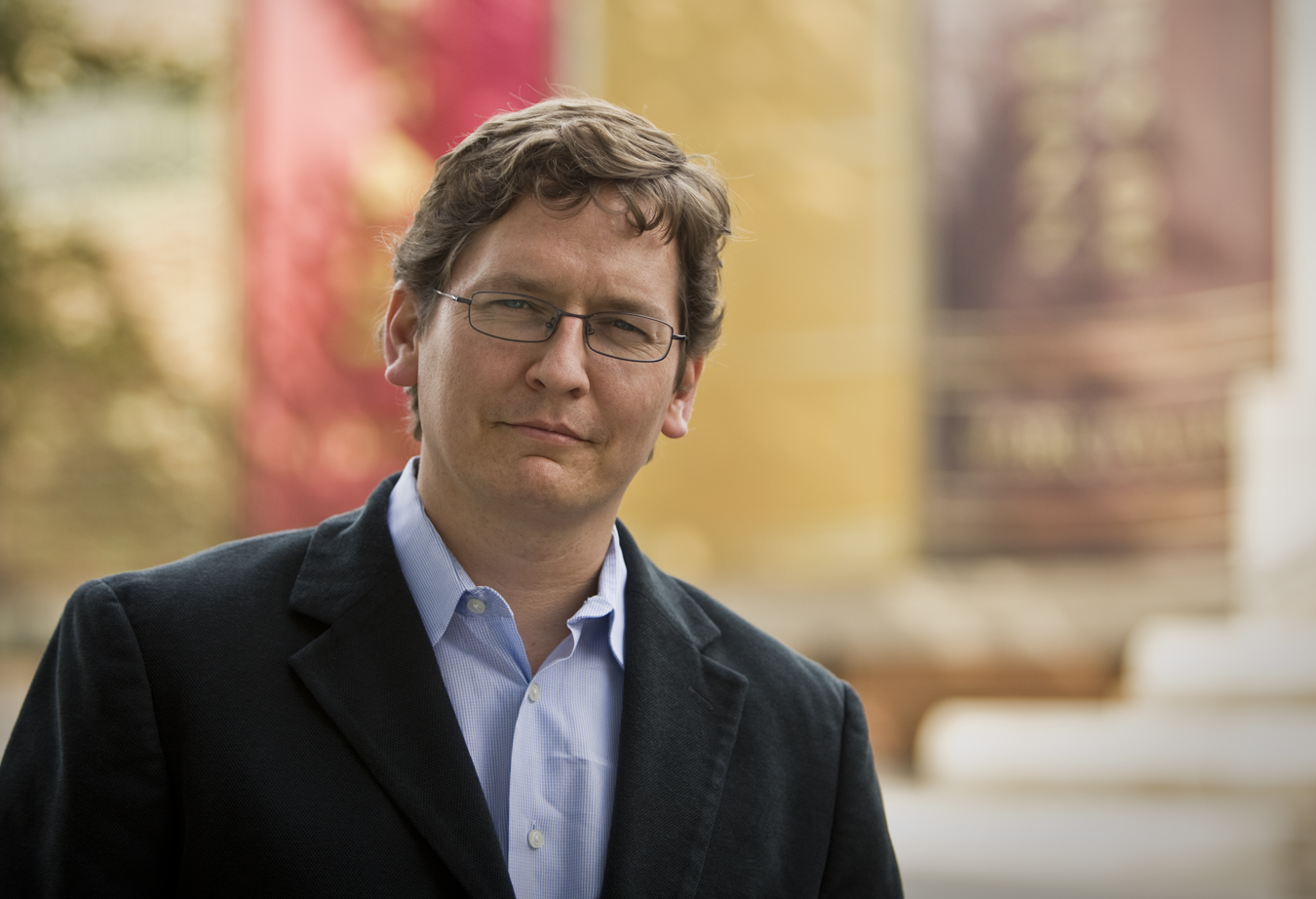
- Wilbanks in Kansas City in 2009
- Education: Tulane University (BA); The Sorbonne
- Occupation: Senior Fellow
- Organization: Ewing Marion Kauffman Foundation

John Wilbanks is a Senior Fellow at the Datasphere Initiative, former Head of Data at Biogen Digital Health, former Chief Commons Officer at Sage Bionetworks, and executive director at Science Commons. He served as a Senior Fellow at the Ewing Marion Kauffman Foundation and at FasterCures. He is known for his work on informed consent, open science and research networks. Wilbanks led a We the People petition supporting the free access of taxpayer-funded research data, which gained over 65,000 signatures. In February 2013, the White House responded, detailing a plan to freely publicize taxpayer-funded research data.

Scientific American featured Wilbanks in "The Machine That Would Predict The Future" in 2011. Seed magazine named Wilbanks among their Revolutionary Minds of 2008, as a "Game Changer" and the Utne Reader named him in 2009 as one of "50 visionaries who are changing your world". He frequently campaigns for wider adoption of open access publishing in science and the increased sharing of data by scientists.

== Education and career ==
Wilbanks grew up in Knoxville, Tennessee, US. He attended Tulane University and received a Bachelor of Arts in philosophy in 1994. He also studied modern letters at the Sorbonne in Paris.

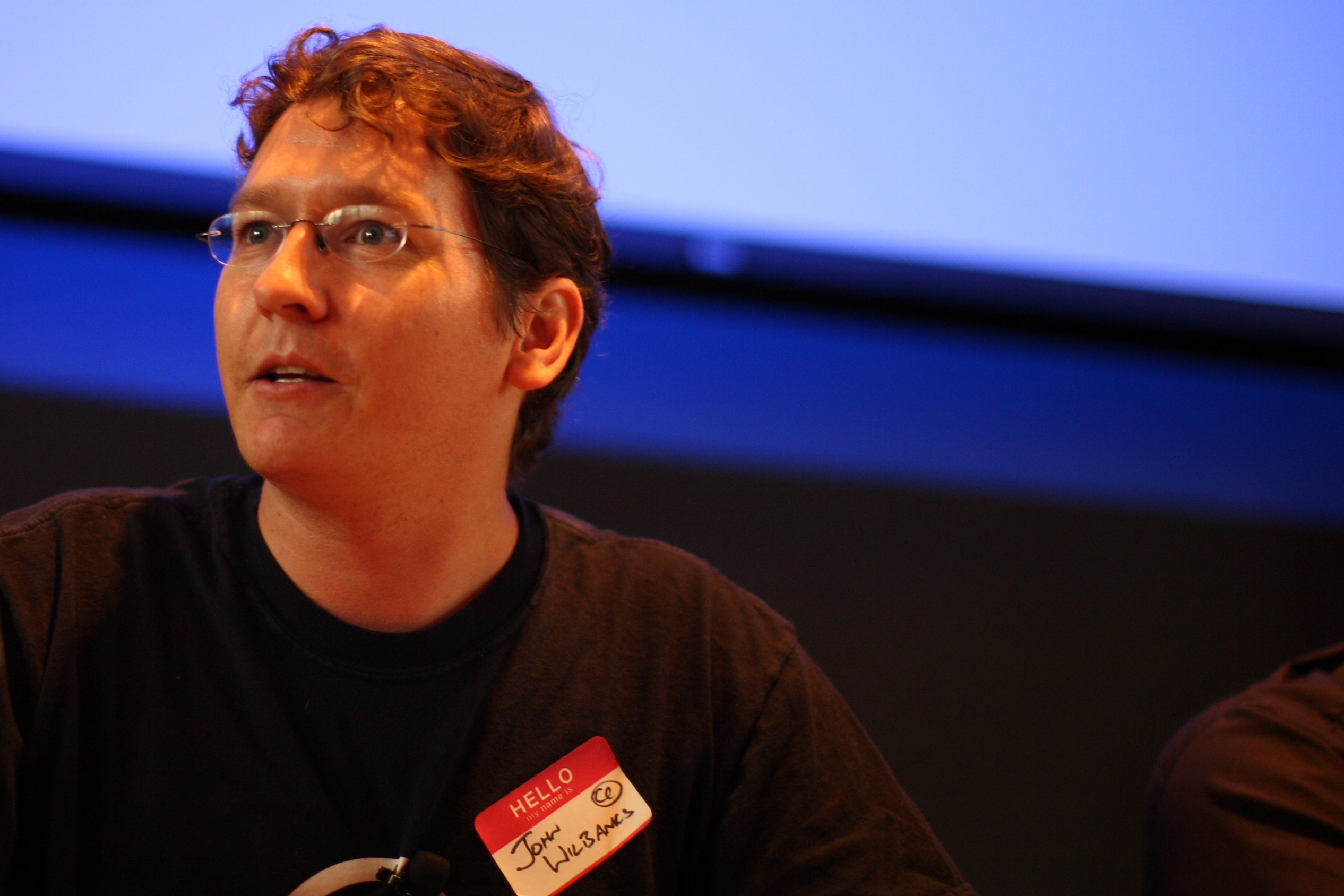
Wilbanks at the FreeCulture.org 2007 National Conference.

From 1994 to 1997, he worked in Washington, D.C., as a legislative aide to Congressman Fortney "Pete" Stark. During this time Wilbanks was also a grassroots coordinator and fundraiser for the American Physical Therapy Association. Wilbanks was the Berkman Center for Internet & Society's first assistant director from the fall of 1998 to the summer of 2000. There he led efforts in software development and Internet-mediated learning, and was involved in the Berkman Center's work on ICANN.

While at the Berkman Center, Wilbanks founded Incellico, Inc., a bioinformatics company that built semantic graph networks for use in pharmaceutical research and development. He served as President and CEO, and led to the company's acquisition in the summer of 2003. He has also served as a Fellow at the World Wide Web Consortium on Semantic Web for Life Sciences, was a visiting scientist in the Project on Mathematics and Computation at MIT, and was a member of the National Advisory Committee for PubMed Central. He was a member of the board of directors for Sage Bionetworks and is on the advisory boards of Genomera, Genomic Arts, and Boundless Learning. He is an original author of the Panton Principles for sharing data.

=== Consent to Research ===
Consent to Research (CtR) was a project that provides a platform for people to donate their health data for the purposes of scientific research and the advancement of medicine. Since health data is restricted and expensive, this project provided people the opportunity to freely donate information that can only positively benefit medicine and patients at large. Consent to Research was connected to the Access2Research project, which aimed to free access over the Internet to scientific journal articles that are already taxpayer-funded. Wilbanks founded the project in 2011 and gave a TED Global talk about the project in 2012. Ultimately this project followed him to Sage Bionetworks and his work in corporate governance, and finally transitioned into the Participant-Centered Consent Toolkit and integrated into Apple's ResearchKit open source toolkit.

=== Science Commons ===
Wilbanks worked at Science Commons and Creative Commons from October 2004 to September 2011. As vice president of science he ran the Science Commons project for its five-year lifetime and continued to work on science after he joined the core Creative Commons organization. He has been interviewed by Popular Science magazine, KRUU Radio, and BioMed Central to discuss Science Commons.
