= Structure mining =

Finding and extracting information from semi-structured data sets

Structure mining or structured data mining is the process of finding and extracting useful information from semi-structured data sets. Graph mining, sequential pattern mining and molecule mining are special cases of structured data mining.

== Description ==
The growth of the use of semi-structured data has created new opportunities for data mining, which has traditionally been concerned with tabular data sets, reflecting the strong association between data mining and relational databases. Much of the world's interesting and mineable data does not easily fold into relational databases, though a generation of software engineers have been trained to believe this was the only way to handle data, and data mining algorithms have generally been developed only to cope with tabular data.

XML, being the most frequent way of representing semi-structured data, is able to represent both tabular data and arbitrary trees. Any particular representation of data to be exchanged between two applications in XML is normally described by a schema often written in XSD. Practical examples of such schemata, for instance NewsML, are normally very sophisticated, containing multiple optional subtrees, used for representing special case data. Frequently around 90% of a schema is concerned with the definition of these optional data items and sub-trees.

Messages and data, therefore, that are transmitted or encoded using XML and that conform to the same schema are liable to contain very different data depending on what is being transmitted.

Such data presents large problems for conventional data mining. Two messages that conform to the same schema may have little data in common. Building a training set from such data means that if one were to try to format it as tabular data for conventional data mining, large sections of the tables would or could be empty.

There is a tacit assumption made in the design of most data mining algorithms that the data presented will be complete. The other necessity is that the actual mining algorithms employed, whether supervised or unsupervised, must be able to handle sparse data. Namely, machine learning algorithms perform badly with incomplete data sets where only part of the information is supplied. For instance methods based on neural networks. or Ross Quinlan's ID3 algorithm. are highly accurate with good and representative samples of the problem, but perform badly with biased data. Most of times better model presentation with more careful and unbiased representation of input and output is enough. A particularly relevant area where finding the appropriate structure and model is the key issue is text mining.

XPath is the standard mechanism used to refer to nodes and data items within XML. It has similarities to standard techniques for navigating directory hierarchies used in operating systems user interfaces. To data and structure mine XML data of any form, at least two extensions are required to conventional data mining. These are the ability to associate an XPath statement with any data pattern and sub statements with each data node in the data pattern, and the ability to mine the presence and count of any node or set of nodes within the document.

As an example, if one were to represent a family tree in XML, using these extensions one could create a data set containing all the individuals node in the tree, data items such as name and age at death, and counts of related nodes, such as number of children. More sophisticated searches could extract data such as grandparents' lifespans etc.

The addition of these data types related to the structure of a document or message facilitates structure mining.

== See also ==
- Graph kernel
- Structured content
- Inductive programming
