= RDKit =

Open-source toolkit for cheminformatics

- Developer: Greg Landrum
- Initial release: 2006; 20 years ago
- Stable release: 2023.03.1 / March 30, 2023; 3 years ago
- Written in: C++ and Python
- Operating system: Linux, macOS, and Microsoft Windows
- Platform: Many
- Available in: English
- Type: Chemoinformatics
- License: BSD License 2.0
- Website: www.rdkit.org
- Repository: github.com/rdkit/rdkit

RDKit is open-source toolkit for cheminformatics. It was developed by Greg Landrum with numerous additional contributions from the RDKit open source community. It has an application programming interface (API) for Python, Java, C++, and C#.
