= Cheminformatics =

Computational chemistry

Cheminformatics (also known as chemoinformatics) refers to the use of physical chemistry theory with computer and information science techniques—so called "in silico" techniques—in application to a range of descriptive and prescriptive problems in the field of chemistry, including in its applications to biology and related molecular fields. Such in silico techniques are used, for example, by pharmaceutical companies and in academic settings to aid and inform the process of drug discovery, for instance in the design of well-defined combinatorial libraries of synthetic compounds, or to assist in structure-based drug design. The methods can also be used in chemical and allied industries, and such fields as environmental science and pharmacology, where chemical processes are involved or studied.

== History ==
Cheminformatics has been an active field in various guises since the 1970s and earlier, with activity in academic departments and commercial pharmaceutical research and development departments. The term chemoinformatics was defined in its application to drug discovery by F.K. Brown in 1998:

Chemoinformatics is the mixing of those information resources to transform data into information and information into knowledge for the intended purpose of making better decisions faster in the area of drug lead identification and optimization.

Since then, both terms, cheminformatics and chemoinformatics, have been used, although, lexicographically, cheminformatics appears to be more frequently used, despite academics in Europe declaring for the variant chemoinformatics in 2006. In 2009, a prominent Springer journal in the field was founded by transatlantic executive editors named the Journal of Cheminformatics.

== Background ==
Cheminformatics combines the scientific working fields of chemistry, computer science, and information science—for example in the areas of topology, chemical graph theory, information retrieval and data mining in the chemical space. Cheminformatics can also be applied to data analysis for various industries like paper and pulp, dyes and such allied industries.

== Applications ==
=== Storage and retrieval ===
A primary application of cheminformatics is the storage, indexing, and search of information relating to chemical compounds. The efficient search of such stored information includes topics that are dealt with in computer science, such as data mining, information retrieval, information extraction, and machine learning.

- Digital libraries
- Unstructured data
- Structured data mining and mining of structured data
  - Database mining
  - Graph mining
  - Molecule mining
  - Sequence mining
  - Tree mining

==== File formats ====
The in silico representation of chemical structures uses specialized formats such as the Simplified molecular input line entry specifications (SMILES) or the XML-based Chemical Markup Language. These representations are often used for storage in large chemical databases. While some formats are suited for visual representations in two- or three-dimensions, others are more suited for studying physical interactions, modeling and docking studies.

=== Virtual libraries ===
Chemical data can pertain to real or virtual molecules. Virtual libraries of compounds may be generated in various ways to explore chemical space and hypothesize novel compounds with desired properties. Virtual libraries of classes of compounds (drugs, natural products, diversity-oriented synthetic products) were recently generated using the FOG (fragment optimized growth) algorithm. This was done by using cheminformatic tools to train transition probabilities of a Markov chain on authentic classes of compounds, and then using the Markov chain to generate novel compounds that were similar to the training database.

=== Virtual screening ===
In contrast to high-throughput screening, virtual screening involves computationally screening in silico libraries of compounds, by means of various methods such as docking, to identify members likely to possess desired properties such as biological activity against a given target. In some cases, combinatorial chemistry is used in the development of the library to increase the efficiency in mining the chemical space. More commonly, a diverse library of small molecules or natural products is screened.

=== Quantitative structure-activity relationship (QSAR) ===
This is the calculation of quantitative structure–activity relationship and quantitative structure property relationship values, used to predict the activity of compounds from their structures. In this context there is also a strong relationship to chemometrics. Chemical expert systems are also relevant, since they represent parts of chemical knowledge as an in silico representation. There is a relatively new concept of matched molecular pair analysis or prediction-driven MMPA which is coupled with QSAR model in order to identify activity cliff.

== See also ==
- Bioinformatics
- Chemical file format
- Chemicalize.org
- Cheminformatics toolkits
- Chemogenomics
- Computational chemistry
- Information engineering
- Journal of Chemical Information and Modeling
- Journal of Cheminformatics
- Materials informatics
- Molecular design software
- Molecular graphics
- Molecular Informatics
- Molecular modelling
- Nanoinformatics
- Software for molecular modeling
- WorldWide Molecular Matrix
- Molecular descriptor
