= Protein Data Bank (file format) =

File format for protein data

PDB
- Filename extension: .pdb, .ent, .brk
- Internet media type: chemical/x-pdb
- Developed by: Protein Data Bank
- Type of format: chemical file format
- Container for: Molecule 3D structure, Protein tertiary structure
- Extended to: mmCIF

The Protein Data Bank (PDB) file format is a textual file format describing the three-dimensional structures of molecules held in the Protein Data Bank, now succeeded by the mmCIF format. The PDB format accordingly provides for description and annotation of protein and nucleic acid structures including atomic coordinates, secondary structure assignments, as well as atomic connectivity. In addition experimental metadata are stored. The PDB format is the legacy file format for the Protein Data Bank which has kept data on biological macromolecules in the newer PDBx/mmCIF file format since 2014.

== History ==
The PDB file format was invented in 1972 as a human-readable file that would allow researchers to exchange the atomic coordinates in a given protein through a database system. Its fixed-column width format is limited to 80 or 140 columns, which was based on the width of the computer punch cards that were previously used to exchange the coordinates. Through the years the file format has undergone many changes and revisions. The final update to the PDB file format was in November 2012 with version 3.30.

== Example ==
A typical PDB file describing a protein consists of hundreds to thousands of lines like the following (taken from a file describing the structure of a synthetic collagen-like peptide):

HEADER    EXTRACELLULAR MATRIX                    22-JAN-98   1A3I
TITLE     X-RAY CRYSTALLOGRAPHIC DETERMINATION OF A COLLAGEN-LIKE
TITLE    2 PEPTIDE WITH THE REPEATING SEQUENCE (PRO-PRO-GLY)
...
EXPDTA    X-RAY DIFFRACTION
AUTHOR    R.Z.KRAMER,L.VITAGLIANO,J.BELLA,R.BERISIO,L.MAZZARELLA,
AUTHOR   2 B.BRODSKY,A.ZAGARI,H.M.BERMAN
...
REMARK 350 BIOMOLECULE: 1
REMARK 350 APPLY THE FOLLOWING TO CHAINS: A, B, C
REMARK 350   BIOMT1   1  1.000000  0.000000  0.000000        0.00000
REMARK 350   BIOMT2   1  0.000000  1.000000  0.000000        0.00000
...
SEQRES   1 A    9  PRO PRO GLY PRO PRO GLY PRO PRO GLY
SEQRES   1 B    6  PRO PRO GLY PRO PRO GLY
SEQRES   1 C    6  PRO PRO GLY PRO PRO GLY
...
ATOM      1  N   PRO A   1       8.316  21.206  21.530  1.00 17.44           N
ATOM      2  CA  PRO A   1       7.608  20.729  20.336  1.00 17.44           C
ATOM      3  C   PRO A   1       8.487  20.707  19.092  1.00 17.44           C
ATOM      4  O   PRO A   1       9.466  21.457  19.005  1.00 17.44           O
ATOM      5  CB  PRO A   1       6.460  21.723  20.211  1.00 22.26           C
...
HETATM  130  C   ACY   401       3.682  22.541  11.236  1.00 21.19           C
HETATM  131  O   ACY   401       2.807  23.097  10.553  1.00 21.19           O
HETATM  132  OXT ACY   401       4.306  23.101  12.291  1.00 21.19           O
...

HEADER, TITLE and AUTHOR records
provide information about the researchers who defined the structure; numerous other types of records are available to provide other types of information.
REMARK records
can contain free-form annotation, but they also accommodate standardized information; for example, the REMARK 350 BIOMT records describe how to compute the coordinates of the experimentally observed multimer from those of the explicitly specified ones of a single repeating unit.
SEQRES records
give the sequences of the three peptide chains (named A, B and C), which are very short in this example but usually span multiple lines.
ATOM records
describe the coordinates of the atoms that are part of the protein. For example, the first ATOM line above describes the alpha-N atom of the first residue of peptide chain A, which is a proline residue; the first three floating point numbers are its x, y and z coordinates and are in units of Ångströms. The next three columns are the occupancy, temperature factor, and the element name, respectively.
HETATM records
describe coordinates of hetero-atoms, that is those atoms which are not part of the protein molecule.

== Molecular visualization software capable of displaying PDB files ==
- SAMSON
- Athena
- BALLView
- Bioblender
- CCP4MG
- (UCSF) Chimera
- Cn3D
- Coot
- CueMol
- QuteMol
- Gabedit
- Materials and Processes Simulations (MAPS) platform
- Jmol
- Molden
- Molekel
- Open Visualization Tool(OVITO)
- PyMOL
- RasMol
- UGENE
- VisIt
- VMD
- WHAT IF
- Yasara
- Zeus molecular visualisation
- ePMV
- Discovery Studio
- ParaView
- UnityMol

== 3d Animation software capable of displaying PDB files ==
- Blender (with appropriate extension installed)
- Houdini
- three.js

== See also ==
- Chemical file format
- ScientificPython — provides an interface for Python
- Software for molecular mechanics modeling
