= Avogadro (software) =

Molecular builder/editor software

- Avogadro logo
- Developer: Geoffrey Hutchison
- Release: February 29, 2008; 18 years ago
- Stable release: 2.0.0 / 1 April 2026
- Written in: C++ (Qt)
- Operating system: Linux, macOS, Unix, Windows
- Platform: IA-32, x86-64
- Size: 85.3 MB
- Available in: 14 languages
- List of languages Chinese, English, French, Hungarian, German, Indonesian, Japanese, Korean, Portuguese, Romanian, Spanish, Tamil, Turkish, Ukrainian
- Type: Molecule editor
- License: GPL v2
- Website: avogadro.cc, superseded by two.avogadro.cc
- Repository: github.com/openchemistry/avogadrolibs

Avogadro is a molecule editor and visualizer designed for cross-platform use in computational chemistry, molecular modeling, bioinformatics, materials science, and related areas. It is extensible via a plugin architecture.

== Features ==
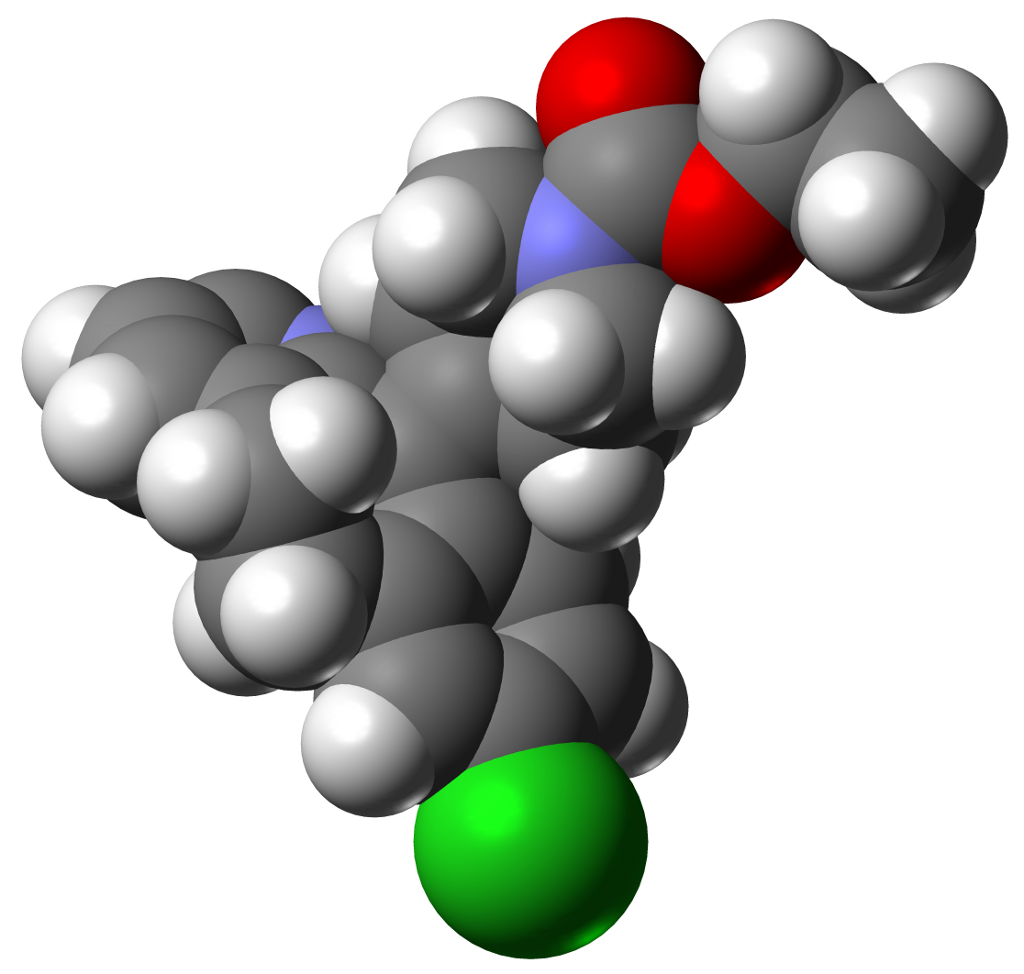
Space-filling model of loratadine created using Avogadro.

- Molecule builder-editor for Windows, Linux, Unix, and macOS.
- All source code is licensed under the GNU General Public License (GPL) version 2.
- Supported languages include: Chinese, English, French, German, Italian, Russian, Spanish, and Polish.
- Supports multi-threaded rendering and computation.
- Plugin architecture for developers, including rendering, interactive tools, commands, and Python scripts.
- OpenBabel import of files, input generation for multiple computational chemistry packages, X-ray crystallography, and biomolecules.

== See also ==
- Molden
- Gabedit
- Molekel
- PyMol
- Jmol
- RasMol
- SAMSON
- UCSF Chimera
- Molecular design software
- List of quantum chemistry and solid state physics software
- List of molecular graphics systems
- Comparison of software for molecular mechanics modeling
- Extensible Computational Chemistry Environment (ECCE)
- Visual Molecular Dynamics (VMD)
- Ghemical
