= Extensible Computational Chemistry Environment =

Extensible Computational Chemistry Environment (ECCE)
- Developers: Pacific Northwest National Laboratory (to 2013); FriendsofECCE (since 2017)
- Stable release: 9.2.0 / October 16, 2026
- Operating system: Linux, macOS, Microsoft Windows (native clients since version 9.0). Up to version 7.0: Linux, Windows (with an X server that supports OpenGL), Mac OS X
- License: Open Source. Educational Community License version 2.0 (ECL 2.0)
- Website: github.com/FriendsofECCE/ECCE
- Repository: github.com/FriendsofECCE/ECCE

The Extensible Computational Chemistry Environment (ECCE, pronounced "etch-ā") is a software environment that provides a graphical user interface, scientific visualization tools, and a data management framework for setting up computational chemistry calculations and storing, retrieving, and analyzing their results. It was developed at Pacific Northwest National Laboratory as the graphical user interface of NWChem, and is now maintained by a group of open-source developers. Ecce is also Latin for "behold".

== Major features ==
- Support for building molecular models.
- Graphical user interface to a broad range of electronic structure theory types. Supported codes include NWChem, Gaussian 09 and 16, ORCA and MOPAC; versions up to 7.0 supported NWChem, GAMESS (UK), Gaussian 03, Gaussian 98, and Amica. Other codes are registered based on user requirements. Quantum ESPRESSO is supported for periodic plane-wave calculations (energies, geometry and cell optimisation, molecular dynamics, DFT+U and dispersion corrections), and GROMACS for molecular dynamics, both as experimental features.
- Graphical user interface for basis set selection.
- Data management: calculations, their inputs, outputs and parsed properties are kept on a data server accessed through WebDAV.
- Remote submission of calculations to UNIX and Linux workstations, Linux clusters, and supercomputers. Supported queue management systems include Slurm, PBS, LSF, Sun Grid Engine, NQE/NQS, LoadLeveler and Maui Scheduler.
- Three-dimensional visualization and graphical display of molecular data properties while jobs are running and after completion. Molecular orbitals and vibrational frequencies are among the properties displayed.
- Support for importing results from NWChem, Gaussian 94, Gaussian 98, and Gaussian 03 calculations run outside of the ECCE environment.
- Extensive web-based help.
- Since version 9.0:
  - ECCE-QM, a built-in Hartree–Fock and density functional theory program, so that calculations can be run without installing another code.
  - A local mode, in which a single computer stores its calculations in a folder without a data server; the client–server setup with a central data server remains available.
  - Native clients for macOS and Microsoft Windows.
  - HTCondor among the supported queue management systems.

== History ==
ECCE was developed at Pacific Northwest National Laboratory (PNNL) for users of its Environmental Molecular Sciences Laboratory (EMSL), initially as the graphical user interface of NWChem. Version 7.0 was released on 1 August 2013 and updated in 2014. Development continued as the FriendsofECCE project on GitHub. In March 2018 PNNL announced that ECCE was no longer a supported product of the EMSL user facility and that new stable and development releases were available from FriendsofECCE. The 8.x series ported ECCE to current Linux distributions and continues with bug fixes; the 9.x series, first released as 9.0.0 in October 2026, separates the client from the server and adds native clients for macOS and Windows.

== See also ==
- NWChem
- Molden
- Avogadro (software)
- Gabedit
- Molekel
- PyMol
- VMD
- Jmol
- RasMol
- Ascalaph Designer
