= PyMOL =

Biology structure visualization software

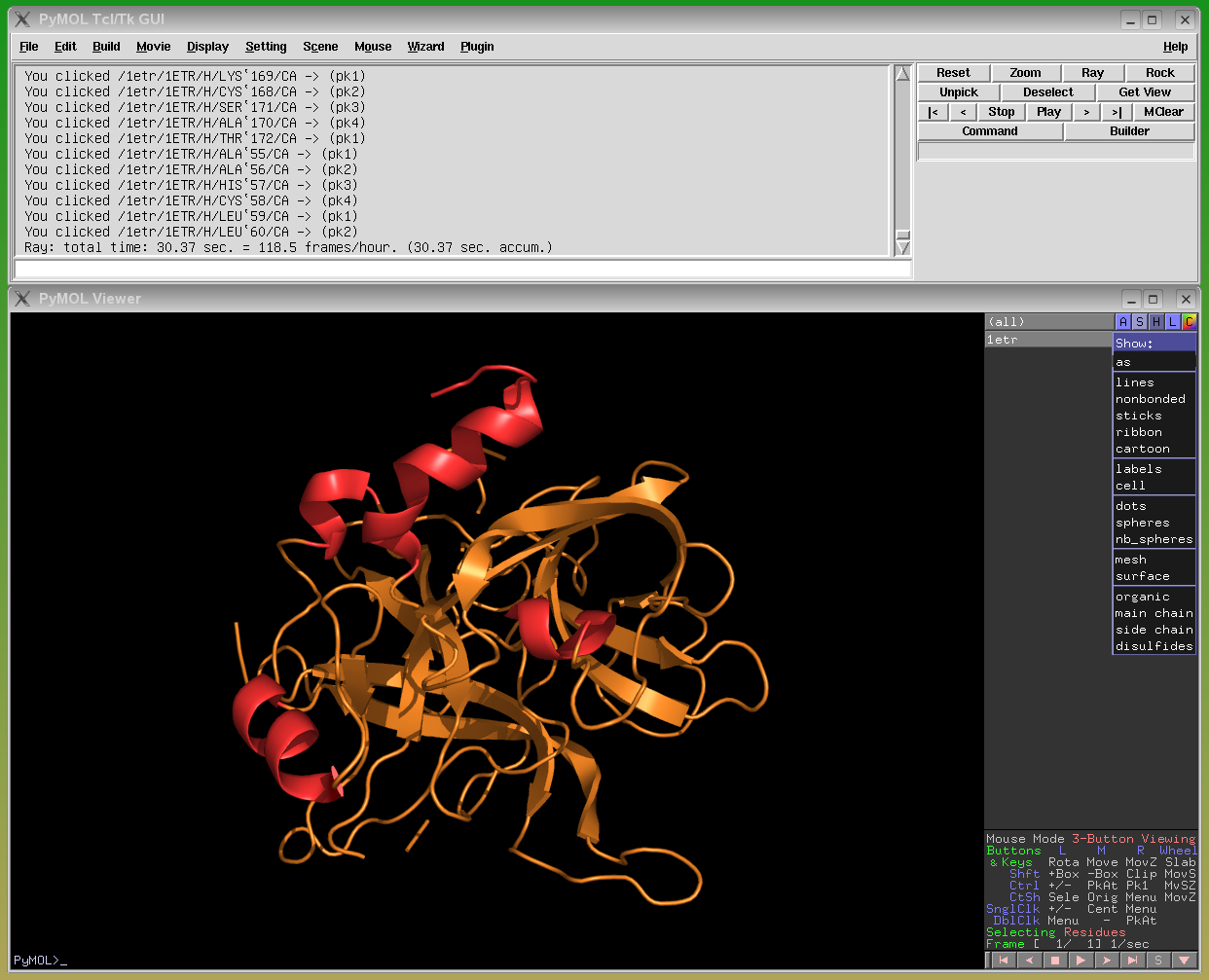
- A PyMOL instance, with the Viewer and GUI visible.
- Original author: Warren Lyford DeLano
- Developer: Schrödinger, Inc.
- Release: 2000; 26 years ago
- Stable release: 3.1.0 / 1 February 2025
- Written in: C, C++, Python
- Operating system: Cross-platform: macOS, Unix, Linux, Windows
- Platform: IA-32, x86-64
- Available in: English
- Type: Molecular modelling
- License: Originally the Python License, now proprietary
- Website: pymol.org/2/
- Repository: github.com/schrodinger/pymol-open-source

PyMOL is a source-available molecular visualization system created by Warren Lyford DeLano. It was commercialized initially by DeLan Scientific LLC, which was a private software company dedicated to creating useful tools that become universally accessible to scientific and educational communities. It is currently commercialized by Schrödinger, Inc. As the original software license was a permissive licence, they were able to remove it; new versions are no longer released under the Python license, but under a custom license (granting broad use, redistribution, and modification rights, but assigning copyright to any version to Schrödinger, LLC.), and some of the source code is no longer released. PyMOL can produce high-quality 3D images of small molecules and biological macromolecules, such as proteins. PyMOL is widely used.

PyMOL is one of the few mostly open-source model visualization tools available for use in structural biology. The Py part of the software's name refers to the program having been written in the programming language Python.

PyMOL uses OpenGL Extension Wrangler Library (GLEW) and FreeGLUT, and can solve Poisson–Boltzmann equations using the Adaptive Poisson Boltzmann Solver. PyMOL used Tk for the GUI widgets and had native Aqua binaries for macOS through Schrödinger, which were replaced with a PyQt user interface on all platforms with the release of version 2.0.

== History and commercialization ==
Early versions of PyMol were released under the Python License. On 1 August 2006, DeLano Scientific adopted a controlled-access download system for precompiled PyMOL builds (including betas) distributed by the company. Access to these executables is now limited to registered users who are paying customers; educational builds are available free to students and teachers. However, most of the current source code continues to be available for free, as are older precompiled builds. While the build systems for other platforms are open, the Windows API (WinAPI, Win32) build system is not, although unofficial Windows binaries are available online. Anyone can either compile an executable from the Python-licensed source code or pay for a subscription to support services to obtain access to precompiled executables.

On 8 January 2010, Schrödinger, Inc. reached an agreement to acquire PyMOL. The firm assumed development, maintenance, support, and sales of PyMOL, including all then-valid subscriptions. They also continue to actively support the PyMOL open-source community. In 2017, Schrödinger revamped the distribution system to unify the user interface under Qt and the package management under Anaconda, and released it as PyMol v2. This version restricts some new functionalities and adds a watermark to the visualization if used unlicensed beyond the 30-day trial period; the overall license policy is similar to the DeLano system. The source code remains mostly available, this time under a BSD-like license. As with the previous distribution, unofficial Windows binaries in the wheel format are available, and indeed Linux distributions continue to provide their own builds of the open-source code.

== Element colors ==
PyMOL applies ball-coloring by element.

Periodic table using PyMOL element colors as background
①	HydrogenH#e5e5e5																		HeliumHe#d8ffff
②	LithiumLi#cc7fff	BerylliumBe#c2ff00												BoronB#ffb5b5	CarbonC#33ff33	NitrogenN#3333ff	OxygenO#ff4c4c	FluorineF#b2ffff	NeonNe#b2e2f5
③	SodiumNa#aa5cf2	MagnesiumMg#8aff00												AluminiumAl#bfa5a5	SiliconSi#f0c79f	PhosphorusP#ff7f00	SulfurS#e5c53f	ChlorineCl#1ef01e	ArgonAr#7fd0e2
④	PotassiumK#8f3fd3	CalciumCa#3cff00		ScandiumSc#e5e5e5	TitaniumTi#bfc2c7	VanadiumV#a5a5aa	ChromiumCr#8a99c7	ManganeseMn#9c7ac7	IronFe#e06633	CobaltCo#f08f9f	NickelNi#4fd04f	CopperCu#c77f33	ZincZn#7c7faf	GalliumGa#c28f8f	GermaniumGe#668f8f	ArsenicAs#bd7fe2	SeleniumSe#ffa000	BromineBr#a52929	KryptonKr#5cb7d0
⑤	RubidiumRb#6f2eaf	StrontiumSr#00ff00		YttriumY#94ffff	ZirconiumZr#94e0e0	NiobiumNb#72c2c8	MolybdenumMo#54b5b5	TechnetiumTc#3a9d9d	RutheniumRu#248f8f	RhodiumRh#097c8c	PalladiumPd#006984	SilverAg#bfbfbf	CadmiumCd#ffd88f	IndiumIn#a57472	TinSn#667f7f	AntimonySb#9d62b5	TelluriumTe#d37a00	IodineI#940094	XenonXe#419daf
⑥	CaesiumCs#57168f	BariumBa#00c800	1 asterisk	LutetiumLu#00aa24	HafniumHf#4cc2ff	TantalumTa#4ca5ff	TungstenW#2194d5	RheniumRe#267caa	OsmiumOs#266695	IridiumIr#165487	PlatinumPt#d0d0e0	GoldAu#ffd023	MercuryHg#b7b7d0	ThalliumTl#a5544c	LeadPb#575961	BismuthBi#9d4fb5	PoloniumPo#aa5c00	AstatineAt#744f44	RadonRn#418295
⑦	FranciumFr#410066	RadiumRa#007c00	1 asterisk	LawrenciumLr#c70066	RutherfordiumRf#cc0059	DubniumDb#d0004f	SeaborgiumSg#d80044	BohriumBh#e00037	HassiumHs#e5002e	MeitneriumMt#ea0026	DarmstadtiumDs–	RoentgeniumRg–	CoperniciumCn–	NihoniumNh–	FleroviumFl–	MoscoviumMc–	LivermoriumLv–	TennessineTs–	OganessonOg–
			1 asterisk	LanthanumLa#6fd3ff	CeriumCe#ffffc7	PraseodymiumPr#d8ffc7	NeodymiumNd#c7ffc7	PromethiumPm#a2ffc7	SamariumSm#8fffc7	EuropiumEu#61ffc7	GadoliniumGd#44ffc7	TerbiumTb#2fffc7	DysprosiumDy#1effc7	HolmiumHo#00ff9c	ErbiumEr#00e574	ThuliumTm#00d351	YtterbiumYb#00bf37
			1 asterisk	ActiniumAc#6faafa	ThoriumTh#00baff	ProtactiniumPa#00a0ff	UraniumU#008fff	NeptuniumNp#007fff	PlutoniumPu#006aff	AmericiumAm#545cf2	CuriumCm#775ce2	BerkeliumBk#8a4fe2	CaliforniumCf#a036d3	EinsteiniumEs#b21ed3	FermiumFm#b21eba	MendeleviumMd#b20ca5	NobeliumNo#bd0c87

== Gallery ==
Example of some molecule editing features of PyMOL, dihedral bond rotation and interactive molecular relaxation with Sculpting mode. These are useful features to prepare input geometry for quantum chemistry software

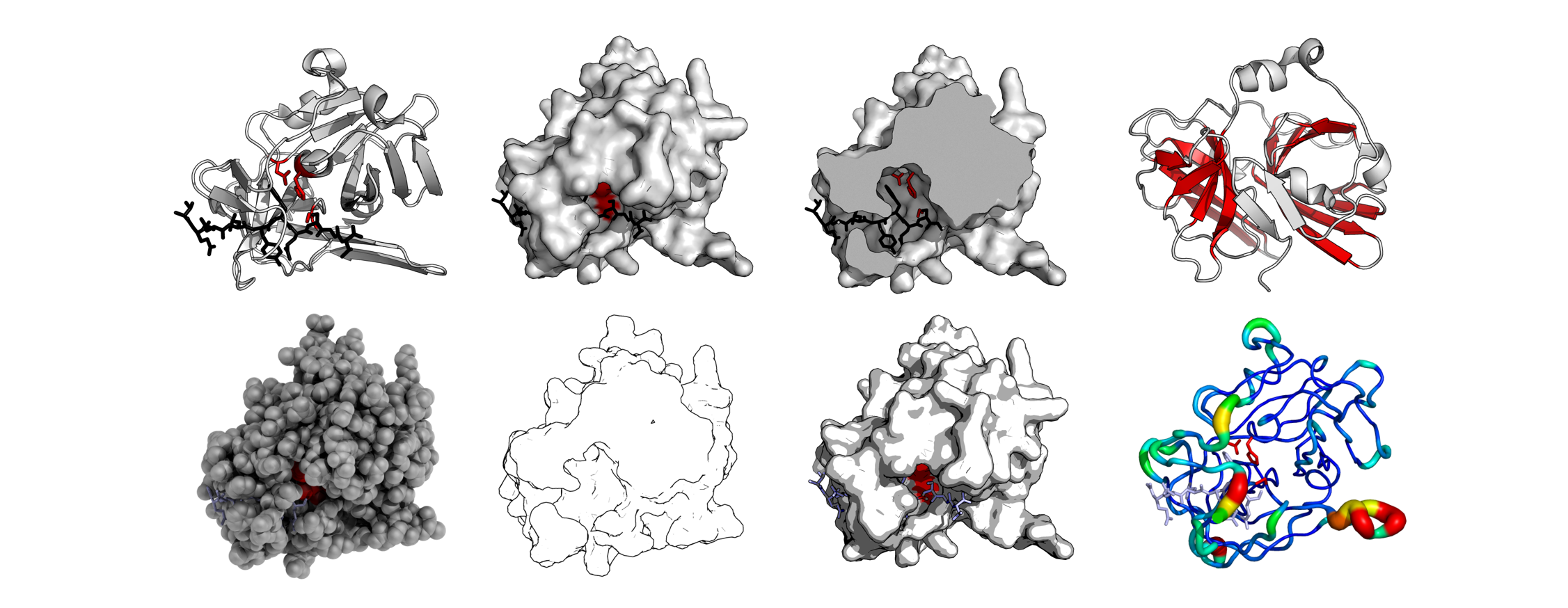
The same protein structure (TEV protease - PDB: 1LVB) rendered in different modes. Standard cartoon, surface, cut-through of surface, highlighted barrels, 'QuteMol'-like, 'Goodsell'-like, glossy-surface, and b-factor putty.

== See also ==
- List of molecular graphics systems
- Molecular modelling
- Gabedit
- Molden
- Molekel
- RasMol
- SAMSON
- UCSF Chimera
- List of free and open-source software packages
