= List of molecular graphics systems =

This is a list of notable software systems that are used for visualizing macromolecules.

| Name | Data | License | Technology | Citations | Comments |
|---|---|---|---|---|---|
| Amira | EM MM MRI Optical SMI XRD | Proprietary | Windows, Linux, Mac | | Based on OpenInventor/OpenGL; focusing on life and biomedical sciences. |
| Ascalaph Designer | MM MD QM | Proprietary | C++ | | Graphics, model building, molecular mechanics, quantum chemistry. |
| Avizo | EM MM MRI Optical SMI XRD | Proprietary | Windows, Linux, Mac | | Avizo is derived from Amira and focusing on materials science. |
| Avogadro | MM XRD MD | Free open-source, GPL | C++, Qt, extensible via Python modules | | |
| BALL | Molecular dynamics MM NMR | LGPL open-source | Standalone program | | |
| Cn3D | | Free open-source | Standalone program | | In the NCBI C++ toolkit |
| Coot | XRD | Free open-source | | | |
| ECCE | MM MD QM | Free open-source, ECL 2.0 | C++, wxWidgets, Open Inventor (Coin3D) | | Builds input for and runs quantum chemistry and molecular dynamics codes; shows orbitals, densities, electrostatic potentials and vibrations |
| Gabedit | XRD MM | Free open-source | C | | |
| Jmol | | Free open-source | Java (applet or standalone program); Transpiled HTML5/JavaScript for browser | | Supports advanced capabilities such as loading multiple molecules with independent movement, surfaces and molecular orbitals, cavity visualization, crystal symmetry |
| MDL Chime | | Proprietary, free use noncommercial | C++ browser plugin for Windows only | | Build and visualize molecule and periodic systems (crystal, structures, fluids...), animate trajectories, visualize molecular orbitals, density, electrostatic potential... visualize graph such IR, NMR, dielectric and optical tensors. |
| Molden | MM XRD | Proprietary, free use academic | | | |
| Molecular Operating Environment (MOE) | HM MD MM NA QM SMI XRD | Proprietary | Windows, Linux, OS X; SVL programming language | | Build, edit and visualise small molecules, macromolecules, protein-ligand complexes, crystal lattices, molecular and property surfaces. Platform for extensive collection of molecular modelling / drug discovery applications. |
| Molekel | MM XRD | Free open-source | Java 3D applet or standalone program | | |
| Mol* (Molstar) | | Free open-source | Web-based; uses WebGL and TypeScript | | Integrated into RCSB and PDBe websites |
| PyMOL | MM XRD SMI EM | Open-source | Python | | |
| RasMol | | Free open-source | C standalone program | | |
| SAMSON | MM MD SMI MRI | Proprietary, limited free version | Windows, Linux, Mac. C++ (Qt) | | Computational nanoscience: life sciences, materials, etc. Modular architecture, modules termed SAMSON Elements. |
| Sirius | | Free open-source | Java 3D applet or standalone program | | No longer supported as of 2011. |
| Scigress | MM QM | Proprietary | Standalone program | | Edit, visualize and run simulations on various molecular systems. |
| Spartan | MM QM | Proprietary | Standalone program | | Visualize and edit biomolecules, extract bound ligands from PDB files for further computational analysis, full molecular mechanics and quantum chemical calculations package with streamlined graphical user interface. |
| UCSF Chimera | XRD SMI EM MD | Free open-source for noncommercial use | Python | | Includes single/multiple sequence viewer, structure-based sequence alignment, automatic sequence-structure crosstalk for integrated analyses. |
| VMD | EM MD MM | Free open-source for noncommercial use | C++ | | |
| WHAT IF | HM XRD | Proprietary, shareware for academics | Fortran, C, OpenGL, standalone | | |
| YASARA | HM NMR XRC | Proprietary, limited free version | C-assembly, Windows, Linux, Mac | | Fully featured molecular modeling and simulation program, incl., structure prediction and docking. Graphical or text mode (clusters), Python interface. |

== Key ==
The tables below indicate which types of data can be visualized in each system:

- EM – Electron microscopy
- HM – Homology modeling
- MD – Molecular dynamics
- MM – Molecular modelling, molecular orbital visualizing
- MRI – Magnetic resonance imaging
- NA – Nucleic acids
- NMR – Nuclear magnetic resonance
- Optical – Optical microscopy
- QM – Quantum chemistry
- SMI – Small molecule interactions
- XRD – X-ray crystallography data such as electron density

== See also ==
- Biological data visualization
- Comparison of nucleic acid simulation software
- Comparison of software for molecular mechanics modeling
- List of microscopy visualization systems
- List of open-source bioinformatics software
- Molecular graphics
- Molecule editor
