= ORCA (quantum chemistry program) =

Quantum chemistry software

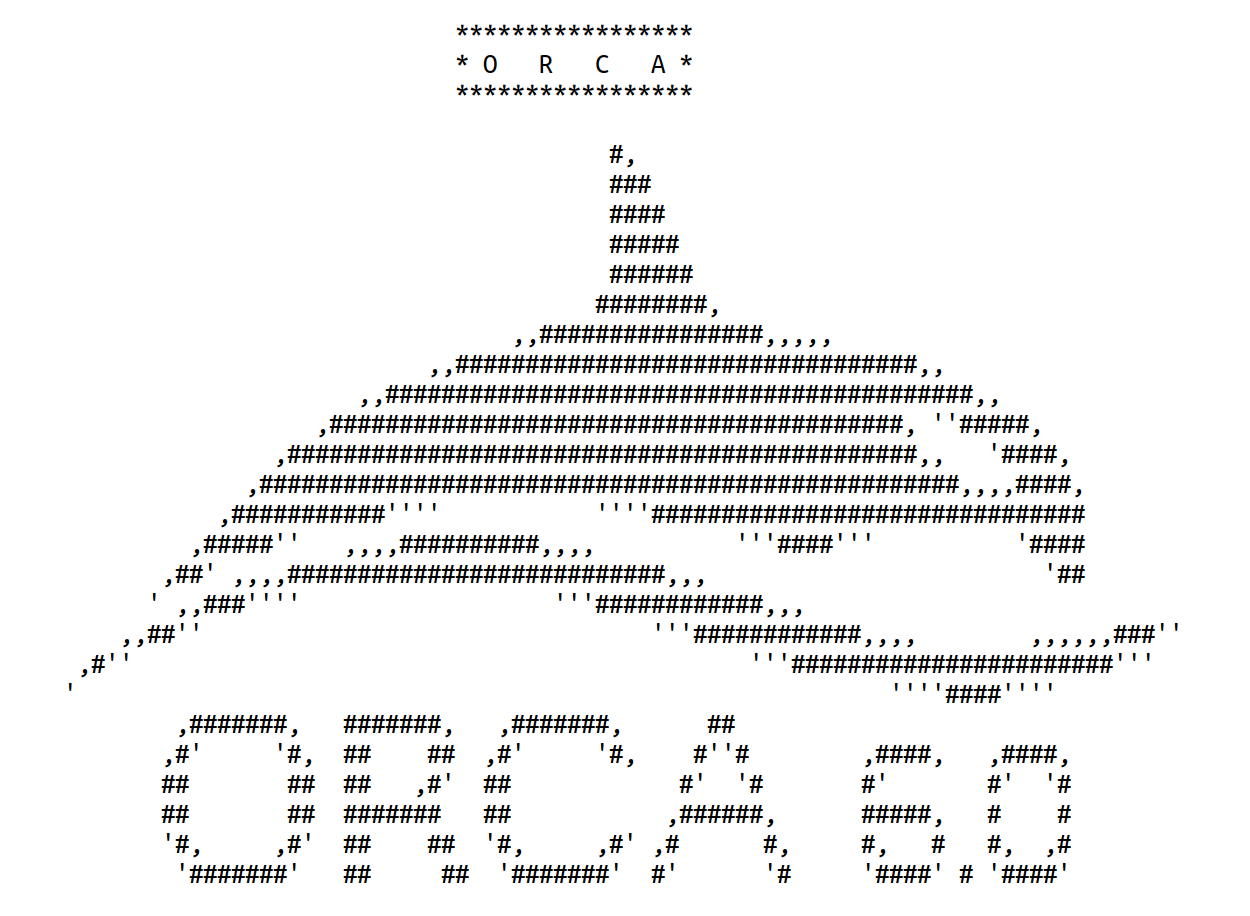
- Developers: Frank Neese, FACCTs GmbH
- Stable release: 6.1.1 / 2 December 2025; 10 months ago
- Written in: C++
- Operating system: Linux, Microsoft Windows, macOS
- Type: Computational chemistry
- License: Academic, Commercial
- Website: www.faccts.de/orca/

Annual citations to ORCA according to FACCTs

ORCA is a general-purpose quantum chemistry package featuring a variety of methods including semi-empirical, density functional theory, many-body perturbation, coupled cluster, and multireference methods. ORCA provides an easy-to-learn input structure and thus high accessibility of quantum chemical approaches and workflows. The ORCA program package is mainly developed by Frank Neese, the department of molecular theory and spectroscopy at the Max-Planck-Institut für Kohlenforschung (MPI KoFo), and the FACCTs GmbH which also manages commercial licensing to industry. ORCA is generally freely available for academic use.

== History ==
The development of ORCA started in 1997, while Frank Neese was on his PostDoc at Stanford University. Since then the ORCA development went on, following Neese to his stations at the University of Bonn, the Max-Planck-Institute for Chemical Energy Conversion, and finally the Max-Planck-Institut für Kohlenforschung. Since then, the ORCA development team grew constantly involving the whole department of molecular theory and spectroscopy at the MPI KoFo and various external academic developers contributing to ORCA.

In 2016, Frank Neese co-founded the FACCTs GmbH as a spin-off of the Max-Planck-Society to commercially license the ORCA program package to industry. In contrast to many other commercialized quantum chemistry programs, ORCA remains freely available for academic use.

Since its first release, the number of active users and developers grew steadily peaking in 90000+ registered users and 4000+ citations to ORCA per year.

== Selected Features ==
- Hartree-Fock Theory
- Efficient DFT and TDDFT implementation featuring RIJCOSX
- MPn perturbation theory
- Coupled-Cluster and local Coupled Cluster (DLPNO-CCSD(T))
- Multireference methods
- Semiempirical methods
- Multiscale methods including QM/MM

== Release history ==
- 1.0.0: 1997 (no public release)
- 2.0.0: Sep. 1999
- 2.4.0: 2004
- 2.6.0: 2006
- 2.7.0: 2007
- 2.9.0: 2008
- 3.0.0: 2011
- 3.0.2: Jun. 2014
- 3.0.3: Dec. 2014
- 4.0.0: Mar. 2017
- 4.1.0: Dec. 2018
- 4.2.0: Aug. 2019
- 5.0.0: Jul. 2021
- 6.0.0: Jul. 2024
- 6.1.0: Jun. 2025
- 6.1.1: Dec. 2025

== Graphic interfaces ==
- Avogadro
- Chemcraft
- UCSF ChimeraX
- Molden
- Ascalaph Designer
- Gabedit
- ECCE

== See also ==
- List of quantum chemistry and solid-state physics software
