= Biological Magnetic Resonance Data Bank =

Content
- Description: Repository of NMR data from biological molecules
- Data types captured: NMR data from peptides, proteins, nucleic acids and other biologically relevant molecules

Access
- Data format: NMR-STAR 3.2
- Website: https://bmrb.io
- Download URL

Miscellaneous
- License: Public domain

The Biological Magnetic Resonance Data Bank (BioMagResBank or BMRB) is an open access repository of nuclear magnetic resonance (NMR) spectroscopic data from peptides, proteins, nucleic acids and other biologically relevant molecules. The database is operated by UConn Health at the University of Connecticut and is supported by the National Institute of General Medical Sciences. The BMRB is part of the Research Collaboratory for Structural Bioinformatics and, since 2006, it is a partner in the Worldwide Protein Data Bank (wwPDB). The repository accepts NMR spectral data from laboratories around the world and, once the data is validated, it is available online at the BMRB website. The database has also an ftp site, where data can be downloaded in the bulk. The BMRB has two mirror sites, one at the Protein Database Japan (PDBj) at Osaka University and one at the Magnetic Resonance Research Center (CERM) at the University of Florence in Italy. The site at Japan accepts and processes data depositions.

== Content ==
=== NMR spectral values and derived information ===
The bulk of the data deposited at the BMRB consists of over 11,900 entries containing ^{1}H, ^{13}C, ^{15}N and ^{31}P assigned chemical shifts and coupling constants of peptides, proteins and nucleic acids. Other derived data like residual dipolar couplings (RDC), relaxation parameters, NOE values, order parameters and hydrogen exchange rates are also available. The database contains also a smaller amount of NMR data from carbohydrates, cofactors and ligands. These data are crossreferenced to 3D structures in the PDB when available. The NMR data are provided in the NMR-STAR file format and a number of format conversion tools are available at the site to convert files from NMR-STAR to other formats.

=== NMR restraints grid ===
The NMR restraints grid contains NMR restraints data from over 2500 proteins and nucleic acids collected from PDB depositions. The grid is constructed as four subsets of data:

- The original NMR data: This subset contains data as found in depositions from the PDB. The data are in various different file formats and contain information about interatomic distances, dihedral angles and RDC restraints.
- Parsed restraints data: Most of the entries in the original data subset have been parsed into the NMR-star file format facilitating its access and use. This subset contains over 9,400 entries.
- Converted restraints data (DOCR): Over 500 entries in the parsed subset have been converted to make the atom nomenclature consistent with the corresponding atomic coordinates.
- Filtered restraints data (FRED): The data in the DOCR were filtered to remove duplicates, redundancies, inconsistencies and values that do not contribute to structure calculations.

=== Time-domain data ===
The BMRB has archived sets of raw time-domain data collected from NMR experiments carried out to calculate restraints and chemical shifts in peptides, proteins and nucleic acids. This collection contains over 200 entries and in many cases the pulse-sequences and the acquisition parameters used are also available.

=== NMR spectral data from metabolomic compounds ===
The BMRB hosts a database containing NMR spectral data from hundreds of metabolomic compounds. For most compounds, ^{1}H NMR, ^{13}C NMR, ^{13}C 90^{o} DEPT, ^{13}C 135^{o} DEPT, ^{1}H-^{1}H TOCSY and ^{1}H-^{13}C HSQC are available.

=== NMR statistics ===
The BMRB provides a collection of NMR statistical data, including chemical shift distributions for individual atoms in amino acids, ribonucleotides and deoxyribonucleotides. The data are presented as interactive histograms and density plots.

== Searches ==
=== The BMRB query Grid Interface ===
The BMRB Query Grid Interface, allows to search the database by molecule type (peptide, protein, DNA, RNA, etc.), by data type (^{1}H chemical shift, ^{13}C chemical shift, coupling constant, etc.), by PDB ID number and by BMRB accession number.

=== FASTA search ===
The BMRB site also contains a FASTA search page where the database can be searched for matching nucleotide or peptide sequences.

=== Search Archive page ===
From the Search Archive page, it is possible to carry out searches by accession number, author, title, molecule name, and by ID number from other common databases. An Advanced Search option allows to carry out queries using a variety of search parameters like: entry information, citations, molecular assembly, experimental descriptions, NMR parameters, etc. The page contains also links to restraints and metabolomics searches

=== Restraints search ===
The NMR restraints grid can be searched by PDB or BMRB number, and also by specific kinds of restraints, like torsion angle, distance, residual dipolar coupling, etc.

=== Metabolomics search ===
Through the metabolomics search page. the database can be searched for specific compounds by name, molecular formula, molecular weight, ID number and molecular structure. It can be searched for entries with specific experimental conditions (solvent or field strength). The interface allows also to search for compounds with matching 1D or 2D NMR spectral peak lists.

== Data deposition ==
The BMRB accepts depositions from research groups around the world. Deposition of data containing only NMR spectral data (with no coordinates data) is carried out through the BMRB site using the ADIT-NMR deposition system. The types of data accepted include: NMR spectral parameters, relaxation data, and kinetic and thermodynamic data. Data must be entered in the NMR-STAR format, conversion from other common formats can be carried out using the STARch file converter provided at the site. The site also contains an NMR-STAR template generator which produces formatted tables where NMR data can be entered. NMR time-domain data is uploaded separately via ftp. The BMRB encourages depositors to validate their NMR data before deposition, using one of the validation tools available at the BMRB site, to check for inconsistencies and errors. . Once the data is deposited, it is checked for completeness, consistency and annotated, links to other databases are added and a BMRB accession number is generated. Deposition of data containing NMR and coordinates data is done through the OneDep deposition system of the wwPDB. Once the data is validated and accepted, it receives PDB and BMRB accession numbers.
