= Warren Lyford DeLano =

- Born: June 21, 1972; Philadelphia, Pennsylvania, U.S.
- Died: November 3, 2009 (aged 37); Palo Alto, California, U.S.
- Known for: Sunesis Pharmaceuticals; DeLano Scientific LLC; PyMOL; Open-source advocacy
- Spouse: Beth Pehrson
- Scientific career
- Fields: Bioinformatics, Cheminformatics

Warren Lyford DeLano (June 21, 1972 – November 3, 2009) was a bioinformatician and an advocate for the increased adoption of open source practices in the sciences, and especially drug discovery, where advances which save time and resources can also potentially save lives.

== Biography ==
Born in Philadelphia on June 21, 1972, DeLano was educated at Yale University, where he helped produce campus humor magazine The Yale Record.

In 2000, he launched the PyMOL open-source molecular viewer in an attempt to demonstrate the practical impact open source might have on discovery of new medicines. Since then, PyMOL has been widely adopted for molecular structure visualization within the pharmaceutical industry and at public sector research institutions.

In 2003, DeLano founded DeLano Scientific LLC to commercialize PyMOL and conduct an experiment in the "laboratory of the market" regarding the commercial viability of an open source software company. His hypothesis was that open source software is intrinsically optimal for science, and that scientific software companies which provide open source solutions will, through free market competition, eventually displace companies that favor proprietary solutions.

Delano was married to Beth Pehrson.

He died by suicide on 3 November 2009 at his home in Palo Alto, California.

In 2009 the American Society for Biochemistry and Molecular Biology created the DeLano Award for Computational Biosciences in DeLano's honor. The award acknowledges a scientist for the most accessible and innovative development or application of computer technology to enhance research in the life sciences at the molecular level.

== Public quotes ==
Lack of access to effective software continues to be a major hindrance to scientific progress and therapeutic discovery. For the benefit of all society, we need to pursue new and complementary approaches to the creation and dissemination of scientific software.

— Warren Lyford DeLano, the DeLano Scientific LLC about page

The only way to publish software in a scientifically robust manner is to share source code, and that means publishing via the internet in an open-access/open-source fashion.

— Warren Lyford DeLano, Computational Chemistry List on 12 October 2005

To the pharmaceutical manager, tasked with delivery of robust information systems, open source is simply a way to gain increased flexibility and lower upfront costs in exchange for assuming greater internal responsibility over acquired software.

— Warren Lyford DeLano, Drug Discovery Today v. 10, p. 213, 2005
