= D-Lib Magazine =

- Discipline: Library and information science
- Language: English

Publication details
- History: July 1995 – July 2017 (based on first issue date)
- Publisher: Corporation for National Research Initiatives (USA)

Standard abbreviations
- ISO 4: D-Lib Mag.

Indexing
- ISSN: 1082-9873

Links
- Journal homepage

D-Lib Magazine was an online magazine dedicated to digital library research and development. Past issues are available free of charge. The publication was financially supported by contributions from the D-Lib Alliance. Prior to April 2006, the magazine was sponsored by the Defense Advanced Research Project Agency (DARPA) on behalf of the Digital Libraries Initiative and by the National Science Foundation (NSF). Despite its important role in shaping the then emerging digital library community, D-Lib Magazine eventually folded due in part to an unsustainable funding model, the maturity of the field, and the rise of social media and blogs. After 22 years, 265 issues and 1062 articles D-Lib Magazine ceased publication in July 2017.

D-Lib Magazine was innovative in many ways, including: HTML-only publishing (no PDF versions), open access, and use of persistent identifiers for articles (the Handle System and later DOIs (which are implemented using the Handle System)).
