= Corporation for National Research Initiatives =

American non-profit digital information infrastructure development organization

The Corporation for National Research Initiatives (CNRI), based in Reston, Virginia, is a non-profit organization founded in 1986 by Robert E. Kahn as an "activities center around strategic development of network-based information technologies", including the National Information Infrastructure (NII) in the United States.

CNRI develops the Handle System for managing and locating digital information. CNRI obtained DARPA funding for the development of JPython (Jython), a Python implementation in and for Java, initially created by Jim Hugunin. The MEMS and Nanotechnology Exchange (MNX) is an effort located at CNRI that provides semiconductor implementation services to the United States and was established with support from DARPA.

== History ==
CNRI formerly operated the Secretariat of the Internet Engineering Task Force. Guido van Rossum, pioneer for open source software and creator of Python, at one time worked for this company. The formation and early funding of the Internet Society were led by CNRI. At the first meeting of the Internet Society board, Vint Cerf, representing CNRI, offered, "In the event a deficit occurs, CNRI has agreed to contribute up to USD102000 to offset it." In the event, the contribution was not needed. CNRI did cover many of the expenses of the Internet Society in 1992. They also paid Cerf's salary during 1993, when much of his time was devoted to building the Internet Society.

== Handle System ==
In 1996, the Association of American Publishers announced that R. R. Bowker and the CNRI had been selected to design a Digital Object Identifier system. The effort was initiated after a year-long study of the need for a system to identify electronic copyright ownership and to manage the digital purchase of rights. The CNRI Handle system was first demonstrated at a February 1997 meeting of the Professional/Scholarly Publishing (PSP) division of the AAP meeting in Washington, DC. The Handle System is a technology specification for assigning, managing, and resolving persistent identifiers for digital objects and other resources on the Internet. The DONA System is under consideration at the ITU and has been adopted by several countries.

== D-Lib ==
D-Lib Magazine was an on-line magazine dedicated to digital library research and development, produced by CNRI.

== MEMS and Nanotechnology Exchange (MNX) ==
MNX was established with support from the United States Department of Defense (DoD), specifically, the Defense Advanced Research Projects Agency (DARPA). The MNX is a design and fabrication service provider to the United States research and development (R&D) community for micro- and nano-systems made using semiconductor-based fabrication methodologies. Since its founding in 1998, the MNX has completed over 3,000 different fabrication projects, many of these projects representing cutting-edge research having significant national security and economic importance. MNX has provided implementation services to over 1,000 organizations in the United States, including: defense contractors; DoD and Federal laboratories; leading academic researchers; fortune 500 companies; and many start-ups. The MNX at CNRI was founded and is managed by Dr. Michael Huff.

== MEMS Clearinghouse (MEMSNet) ==
The MEMS Clearinghouse was originally established at USC/ISI with support from the United States Department of Defense (DoD), specifically, the Defense Advanced Research Projects Agency (DARPA). The MNX of CNRI took over the management of the MEMS Clearinghouse under the management of Dr. Michael Huff. It was then renamed the MEMSNet. The MEMSNet includes a number of information and service offerings including: an extensive material property database with references; MEMSTalk which is an on-line discussion groups of people interested in semiconductor technologies; news articles about semiconductor technologies; events and meetings; and more. At one time, MEMSNet was the most popular web site for MEMS technology.

== Software ==
=== DO Repository and DO Registry ===
CNRI developed the Digital Object (DO) Repository software, with digital object architecture which provides a mechanism for the creation of, and access to, digital objects as discrete data structures with unique, resolvable identifiers.

=== GNU Mailman ===
GNU Mailman is a free mailing list manager.

=== Python ===
Python releases 1.3 through 1.6, see Python License

=== DurusWorks ===
DurusWorks was developed by the MEMS and Nanotechnology Exchange program at CNRI managed by Dr. Michael Huff for semiconductor foundry network operations. DurusWorks release 1.2. Dr. David Binger and Neil Schemenaur were the principal developers of DurusWorks.
