= PDBREPORT =

The PDBREPORT database is a database of anomalies and errors found in structures of biological molecules in the Protein Data Bank.

The PDBREPORTS database is a useful facility for judging the quality of protein structures in in silico protein structure bioinformatics projects, and has been used frequently by participants of the CASP homology modelling 'competition'. PDBREPORTs are made using the WHAT_CHECK software. WHAT_CHECK is the option of the WHAT IF software that validates macromolecules (especially proteins).

Many of the WHAT_CHECK options determine normality values; that is, the number of standard deviations that any given observation deviates from its mean. And in most cases such events are listed if the deviation is more than 4 sigma, which implies that one in ten thousand of the listed anomalies is genuine and not an error. The section 'validation' of the WHAT_CHECK pages explains this with more detail.

== Issues ==
PDBREPORT entries may be seen as error reports for macromolecular structures deposited in the PDB. The term error report should be used with caution as the WHAT_CHECK software that produces the PDBREPORT flags every anomaly of four standard deviations or more as an error. Some of these reported anomalies may be genuine deviations from the mean rather than errors.
