= WHAT IF software =

Dutch macromolecular computational program

WHAT IF
- Original authors: Gert Vriend, Chris Sander, Wolfgang Kabsch
- Developers: University of Groningen; EMBL, Heidelberg; CMBI, Radboud University Nijmegen; Radboud University Nijmegen Medical Centre (Radboudumc); WHAT IF Foundation
- Initial release: 6 December 1987; 38 years ago
- Stable release: 6.0 / 2016; 10 years ago
- Written in: Fortran, C, OpenGL
- Operating system: Linux
- Platform: x86
- Available in: English
- Type: Molecular modelling
- License: Proprietary, shareware for academics
- Website: swift.cmbi.umcn.nl/whatif/

WHAT IF is a computer program used in a wide variety of computational (in silico) macromolecular structure research fields. The software provides a flexible environment to display, manipulate, and analyze small and large molecules, proteins, nucleic acids, and their interactions.

== History ==
The first version of the WHAT IF software was developed by Gert Vriend in 1987 at the University of Groningen, Groningen, Netherlands. Most of its development occurred during 1989–2000 at the European Molecular Biology Laboratory (EMBL) in Heidelberg, Germany. Other contributors include Chris Sander, and Wolfgang Kabsch. In 2000, maintenance of the software moved to the Dutch Center for Molecular and Biomolecular Informatics (CMBI) in Nijmegen, Netherlands. It is available for in-house use, or as a web-based resource. As of February 2022, the original paper describing WHAT IF has been cited more than 4,000 times.

== Software ==
WHAT IF provides a flexible environment to display, manipulate, and analyze small molecules, proteins, nucleic acids, and their interactions. One notable use was detecting many millions of errors (often small, but sometimes catastrophic) in Protein Data Bank (PDB) files. WHAT IF also provides an environment for: homology modeling of protein tertiary structures and quaternary structures; validating protein structures, notably those deposited in the PDB; correcting protein structures; visualising macromolecules and their interaction partners (for example, lipids, drugs, ions, and water), and manipulating macromolecules interactively.

WHAT IF is compatible with several other bioinformatics software packages, including YASARA and Jmol.

== See also ==
- List of molecular graphics systems
- Molecule editor
