= Tachyon (software) =

Ray tracing software

- Original author: John E. Stone
- Written in: C
- Type: Ray tracing/3D rendering software
- License: BSD-3-Clause
- Website: jedi.ks.uiuc.edu/~johns/tachyon/

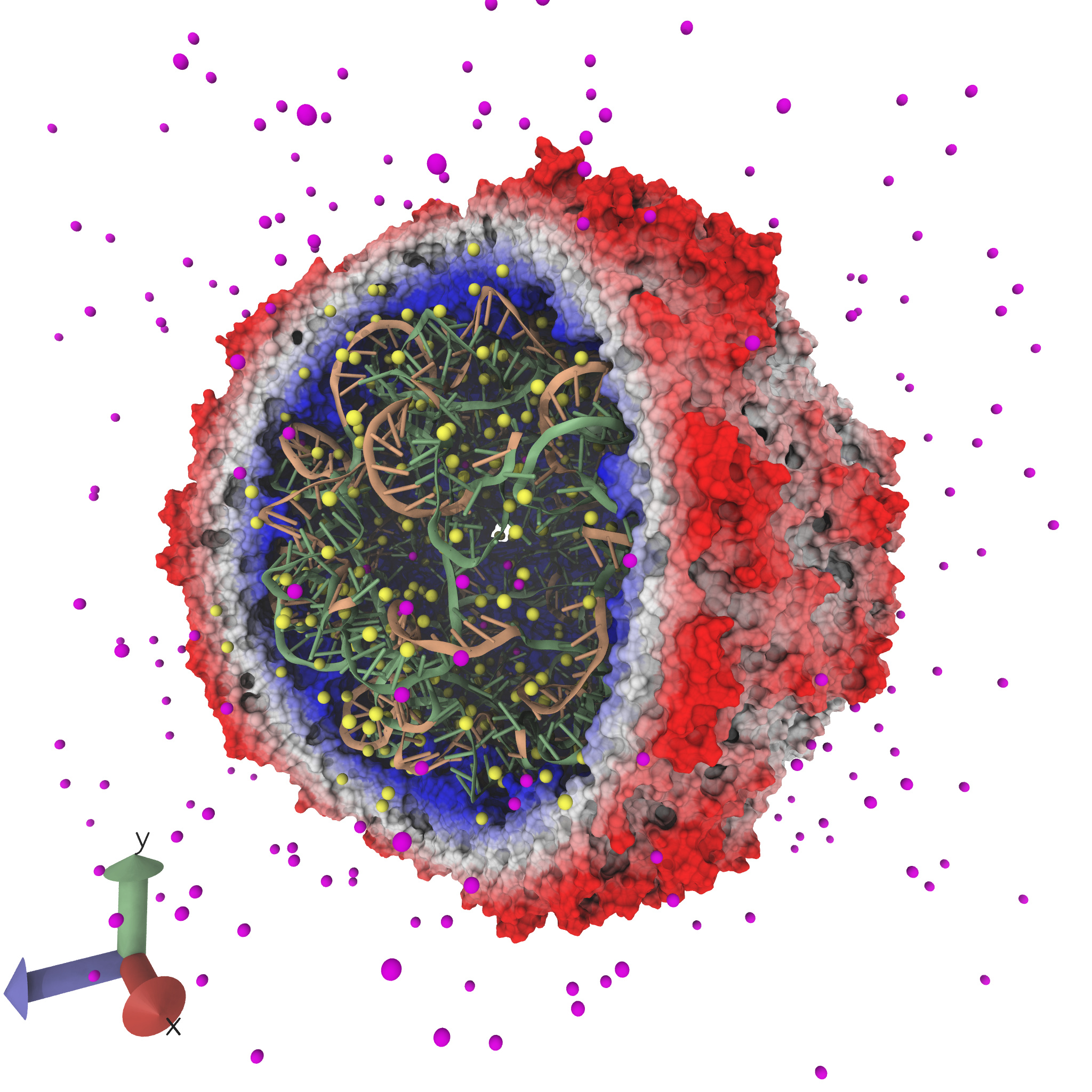
Satellite tobacco mosaic virus molecular graphics produced in VMD and rendered using Tachyon. The scene is shown with a combination of direct lighting and ambient occlusion lighting to improve the visibility of pockets and cavities. The VMD axes are shown as an example of rendering of non-molecular geometry.

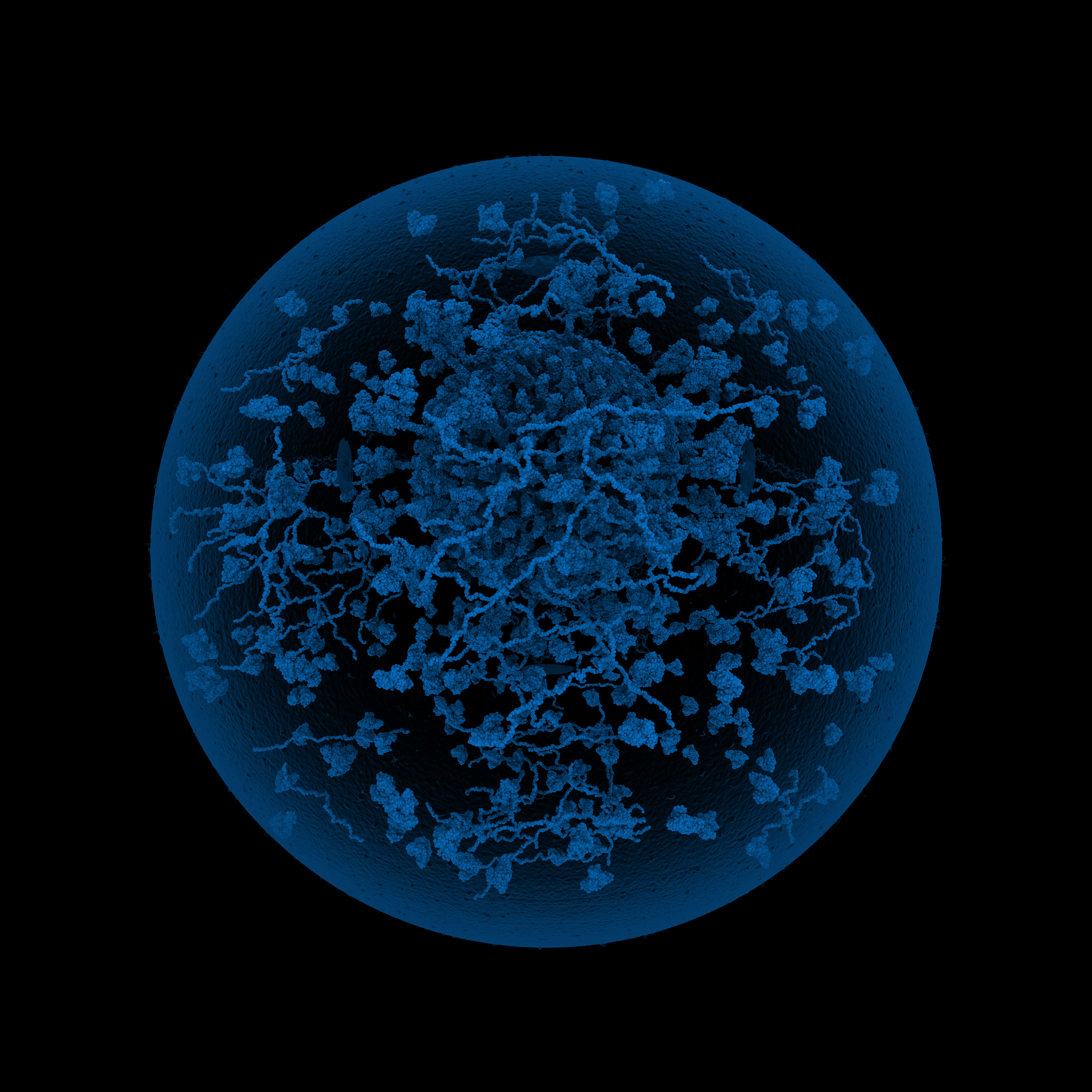
Tachyon rendering of a 1-billion atom aerosolized SARS-CoV-2 virion (COVID-19)

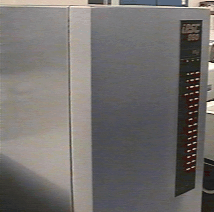
Intel iPSC/860 32-node parallel computer running a Tachyon performance test. August 22, 1995.

Tachyon is a parallel/multiprocessor ray tracing software. It is a parallel ray tracing library for use on distributed memory parallel computers, shared memory computers, and clusters of workstations. Tachyon implements rendering features such as ambient occlusion lighting, depth-of-field focal blur, shadows, reflections, and others. It was originally developed for the Intel iPSC/860 by John Stone for his M.S. thesis at University of Missouri-Rolla. Tachyon subsequently became a more functional and complete ray tracing engine, and it is now incorporated into a number of other open source software packages such as VMD, and SageMath. Tachyon is released under a permissive license (included in the tarball).

== Evolution and features ==
Tachyon was originally developed for the Intel iPSC/860, a distributed memory parallel computer based on a hypercube interconnect topology based on the Intel i860, an early RISC CPU with VLIW architecture, and Tachyon was originally written using Intel's proprietary NX message passing interface for the iPSC series, but it was ported to the earliest versions of MPI shortly thereafter in 1995. Tachyon was adapted to run on the Intel Paragon platform using the Paragon XP/S 150 MP at Oak Ridge National Laboratory. The ORNL XP/S 150 MP was the first platform Tachyon supported that combined both large-scale distributed memory message passing among nodes, and shared memory multithreading within nodes. Adaptation of Tachyon to a variety of conventional Unix-based workstation platforms and early clusters followed, including porting to the IBM SP2. Tachyon was incorporated into the PARAFLOW CFD code to allow in-situ volume visualization of supersonic combustor flows performed on the Paragon XP/S at NASA Langley Research Center, providing a significant performance gain over conventional post-processing visualization approaches that had been used previously. Beginning in 1999, support for Tachyon was incorporated into the molecular graphics program VMD, and this began an ongoing period co-development of Tachyon and VMD where many new Tachyon features were added specifically for molecular graphics. Tachyon was used to render the winning image illustration category for the NSF 2004 Visualization Challenge. In 2007, Tachyon added support for ambient occlusion lighting, which was one of the features that made it increasingly popular for molecular visualization in conjunction with VMD. VMD and Tachyon were gradually adapted to support routine visualization and analysis tasks on clusters, and later for large petascale supercomputers. Tachyon was used to produce figures, movies, and the Nature cover image of the atomic structure of the HIV-1 capsid solved by Zhao et al. in 2013, on the Blue Waters petascale supercomputer at NCSA, U. Illinois. Both CPU and GPU versions of Tachyon were used to render images of the SARS-CoV-2 virion, spike protein, and aerosolized virion in three separate ACM Gordon Bell COVID-19 research projects, including the winning project at Supercomputing 2020, and two finalist projects at Supercomputing 2021.

== Use in parallel computing demonstrations, training, and benchmarking ==
Owing in part to its portability to a diverse range of platforms Tachyon has been used as a test case for a variety of parallel computing and compiler research articles.

In 1999, John Stone assisted Bill Magro with adaptation of Tachyon to support early versions of the OpenMP directive-based parallel computing standard, using Kuck and Associates' KCC compiler. Tachyon was shown as a demo performing interactive ray tracing on DEC Alpha workstations using KCC and OpenMP.

In 2000, Intel acquired Kuck and Associates Inc., and Tachyon continued to be used as an OpenMP demonstration. Intel later used Tachyon to develop a variety of programming examples for its Threading Building Blocks (TBB) parallel programming system, where an old version of the program continues to be incorporated as an example to the present day.

In 2006, Tachyon was selected by the SPEC HPG for inclusion in the SPEC MPI 2007 benchmark suite.

Beyond Tachyon's typical use as tool for rendering high quality images, likely due to its portability and inclusion in SPEC MPI 2007, it has also been used as a test case and point of comparison for a variety of research projects related to parallel rendering and visualization, cloud computing, and parallel computing, compilers, runtime systems, and computer architecture, performance analysis tools, and energy efficiency of HPC systems.

== See also ==
- Visual Molecular Dynamics
