= QuteMol =

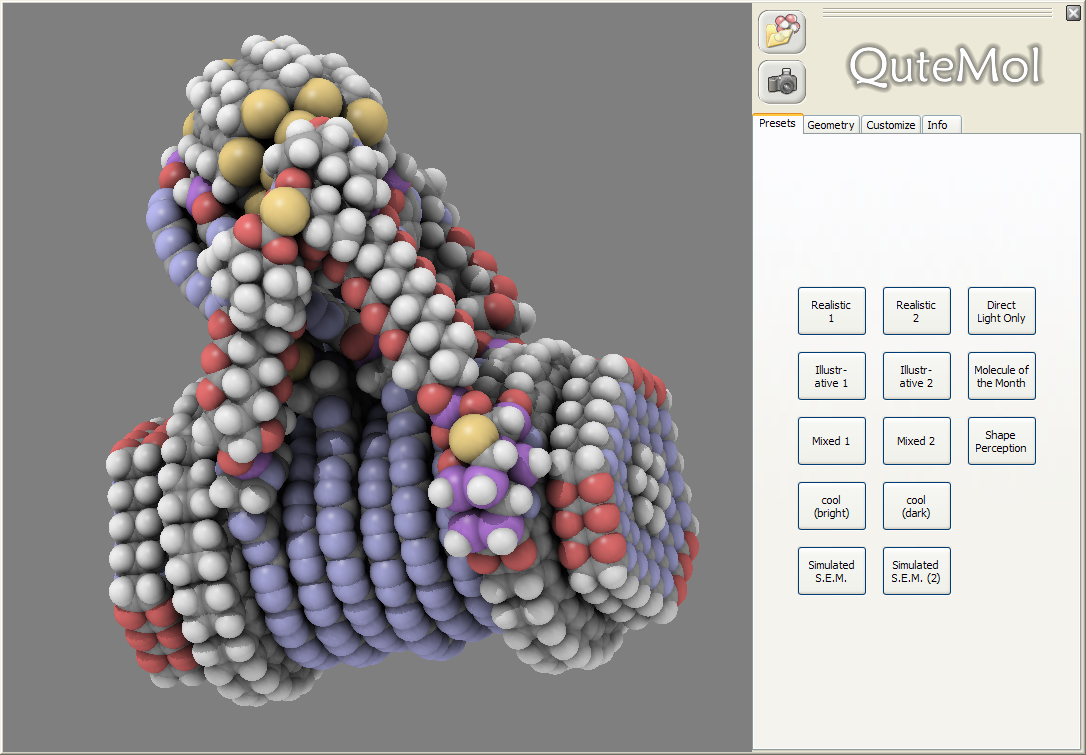
- Qutemol 0.2, interactively showing a nanomachine, with ambient occlusion and cast shadows in real time
- Developer: ISTI - CNR
- Stable release: 0.4.1 / June 6, 2007; 18 years ago
- Written in: C++
- Operating system: Linux, OS X, Windows
- Type: molecular graphics
- License: GPL, citeware
- Website: qutemol.sourceforge.net

QuteMol is an open-source, interactive, molecular visualization system that was based on advanced rendering techniques that make possible to have for the first time a set of innovative visualization modalities in an interactive real-time application. QuteMol was the first system to use the capabilities of GPUs through OpenGL shaders to offer an array of innovative visual effects. QuteMol visualization techniques are aimed at improving clarity and an easier understanding of the 3D shape and structure of large molecules or complex proteins.

In 2021 the IEEE Visualization Conference awarded the paper introducing QuteMol with the Test of Time Award to testify that "contents are still vibrant and useful today and have had a major impact and influence within and beyond the visualization community."

Features available in QuteMol include:

- Real Time ambient occlusion
- Depth Aware Silhouette Enhancement
- Ball and Sticks, space-filling and Liquorice visualization modes
- High resolution antialiased snapshots for creating publication quality renderings
- Interactive rendering of large molecules and protein (100k atoms)
- Standard Protein Data Bank input.

Notably after many years since the last release QuteMol is still used in the molecular visualization community as can be testified by searching on google scholar for papers citing explicitly the tool or the paper for creating high quality images of molecules.

== See also ==
- Molecular graphics
- Molecular modeling on GPU
- List of molecular graphics systems
- List of free and open-source software packages
