= Sirius (visualization software) =

- Developer: San Diego Supercomputer Center
- Final release: 1.2 / November 18, 2008; 17 years ago
- Operating system: Cross-platform: Windows, Linux, macOS
- Type: Molecular modelling
- License: Proprietary freeware for academic, non-profit
- Website: web.archive.org/web/20110406034756/http://sirius.sdsc.edu/

Sirius is a molecular modelling and analysis system developed at San Diego Supercomputer Center. Sirius is designed to support advanced user requirements that go beyond simple display of small molecules and proteins. Sirius supports high quality interactive 3D graphics, structure building, displaying protein or DNA primary sequences, access to remote data sources, and visualizing molecular dynamics trajectories. It can be used for scientific visualization and analysis, and chemistry and biology instruction.

This software is no longer supported as of 2011.

== Key features ==
Sirius supports a variety of applications with a set of features, including:

- Building and editing chemical structures using a library of fragments;
- Protein structure and sequence alignment;
- Command line interpreter and scripting support fully compatible with extant RasMol scripts;
- Full support for molecular dynamics trajectory visualizing;
- BLAST search directly in Protein Data Bank and Uniprot databases;
- Ability to move parts of the loaded data while freezing the rest;
- Interactive calculation of hydrogen bonding, steric clashes, Ramachandran plots;
- Support for all major structure and sequence formats;
- Bundled POV-Ray for creating photorealistic images;
- Integrated selection and coloring across individual visualizing components.

Sirius is based on molecular graphics code and data structures developed as a part of the Molecular Biology Toolkit.

== RasMol-compatible scripting ==
Sirius features a command line interpreter that can be used to quickly manipulate structure appearance and orientation. The set of commands has been patterned after RasMol, so it's fully compatible with extant scripts. Added commands introduced in Sirius provide support for manipulating multiple structures loaded at the same time, and enable more flexible selection.

Extant RasMol scripts can be imported and run within Sirius to produce high quality representations of encoded molecular scenes. Since RasMol uses a coordinate system that differs from that Sirius, internal conversion is performed when RasMol scripts are imported, so that any orientation changes are shown correctly. Any manually entered commands, however, are executed according to the Sirius coordinate system.

Sirius supports several predefined atom-residue sets and color schemes, allows editing of scripts using the Command Panel interface, and logical operators and parentheses can be used to create complex selection commands.

== Visualizing molecular dynamics trajectories ==
Sirius contains a full-featured molecular dynamics visualizing component. It can read output files from AMBER and CHARMM simulations, including compressed and AMBER out files. RMSD changes along the trajectory can be calculated using user-defined atom subsets and displayed in an interactively updated graph. In order to reduce memory requirements, large multifile simulations may be loaded in a buffered mode. If a simulation involves changes in protein fold, Sirius can be set to track and recompute displayed secondary structure features in real time, which provides a convenient way to observe transformations of the structure. The full trajectory or selected frames can be exported as QuickTime video or a set of POV-Ray scene snapshots that can later be converted to a high quality movie.

== Access and download ==
Sirius is distributed freely from the project website to individuals affiliated with academic and non-profit organizations. Native desktop application installers are available for Windows, Linux, and macOS.

== See also ==
- Comparison of software for molecular mechanics modeling
- List of molecular graphics systems
- Molecule editor
- Molecular modelling
- Molecular graphics
- Molecular dynamics
