= Center for Molecular and Biomolecular Informatics =

- Established: 1999
- Laboratory type: Research and education
- President: prof. dr. Peter-Bram 't Hoen
- Location: The Netherlands

The Center for Molecular and Biomolecular Informatics (CMBI) is an academic computational biology (bioinformatics) research department based in Nijmegen (the Netherlands), and is part of the Radboudumc University Medical Center.

Most of the research topics at the CMBI focus strongly on (in silico) biomedical data analysis of biomolecules, and with - because of the department's embedding in a leading Dutch hospital - a strong interest in medical and clinical scientific research lines, both fundamental and translational in nature.

Specific topics of interest involve protein (structure), (meta)genomics as well as the analysis of various other types of omics data (transcriptomics, proteomics, metabolomics, amongst others), and small (bio)molecules and their drug, protein or other molecular interaction partners. Furthermore, especially machine learning (including the application of artificial neural networks), personalized medicine and FAIR data research have a lot of interest and attention by the department.

As of 2023, the CMBI has become part of the Radboudumc Medical BioSciences department.

== History ==
The institute was founded in 1999 at the Radboud University Nijmegen, by the previous department head prof. dr. Gerrit (Gert) Vriend.

In 2008 the institute became part of the Radboudumc (i.e. the Radboud University Medical Center).

In 2023, the CMBI became part of the Radboudumc Medical BioSciences department.

== See also ==
- WHAT IF software
