= Cn3D =

Cn3D is a Windows, Macintosh and Unix-based software from the United States National Library of Medicine that acts as a helper application for web browsers to view three-dimensional structures from The National Center for Biotechnology Information's Entrez retrieval service. It "simultaneously displays structure, sequence, and alignment, and now has powerful annotation and alignment editing features", according to its official site. Cn3D is in public domain with source code available.

The latest version of the software 4.3.1 was released 06 Dec 2013. This version has the ability to view superpositions of 3D structures with similar biological units and an enhanced version of the Vector Alignment Search Tool (VAST).

== See also ==
- List of molecular graphics systems
- Molecular graphics
- List of software for molecular mechanics modeling
