= Mol* =

- Repository: github.com/molstar/molstar
- Written in: TypeScript
- Middleware: React framework
- Engine: WebGL
- Type: Molecular modelling
- License: MIT License
- Website: molstar.org

Mol* (/ˈmoʊlˌstɑːr/, also known as Molstar) is a web-based, open-source, software toolkit for analysis and visualization of macromolecular structures. It was developed as a joint initiative between the RCSB PDB and PDBe, based on NGL (developed by RCSB PDB) and LiteMol (developed by PDBe) viewers. Its program for interactive viewing of macromolecular structures in 3D, Mol* Viewer, was published in 2021. Mol* Viewer (typically referred to as simply Mol*) has a stand-alone version, and is also integrated into a number of scientific tools and databases. Some of its most prominent implementations are the web pages of the PDBe, the RCSB PDB, and the AlphaFold Database, where it is used to provide visualizations of every structure on each structure's corresponding entry page. It replaced the integrated NGL and LiteMol viewers previously used by the RCSB PDB and PDBe in 2019.

The code for Mol*, including Mol* Viewer, is hosted on GitHub (under the Open Source MIT license) and includes modules for retrieving macromolecular structure data from public databases, then compressing, storing and visualizing it. It uses built-in BinaryCIF and decompression support to aid in handling large structures, TypeScript for web application development, and WebGL for hardware-accelerated 3D rendering. It adheres to standards of the open web platform and uses the React framework.
