= Macromolecular Crystallographic Information File =

File format used for macromolecular structure data

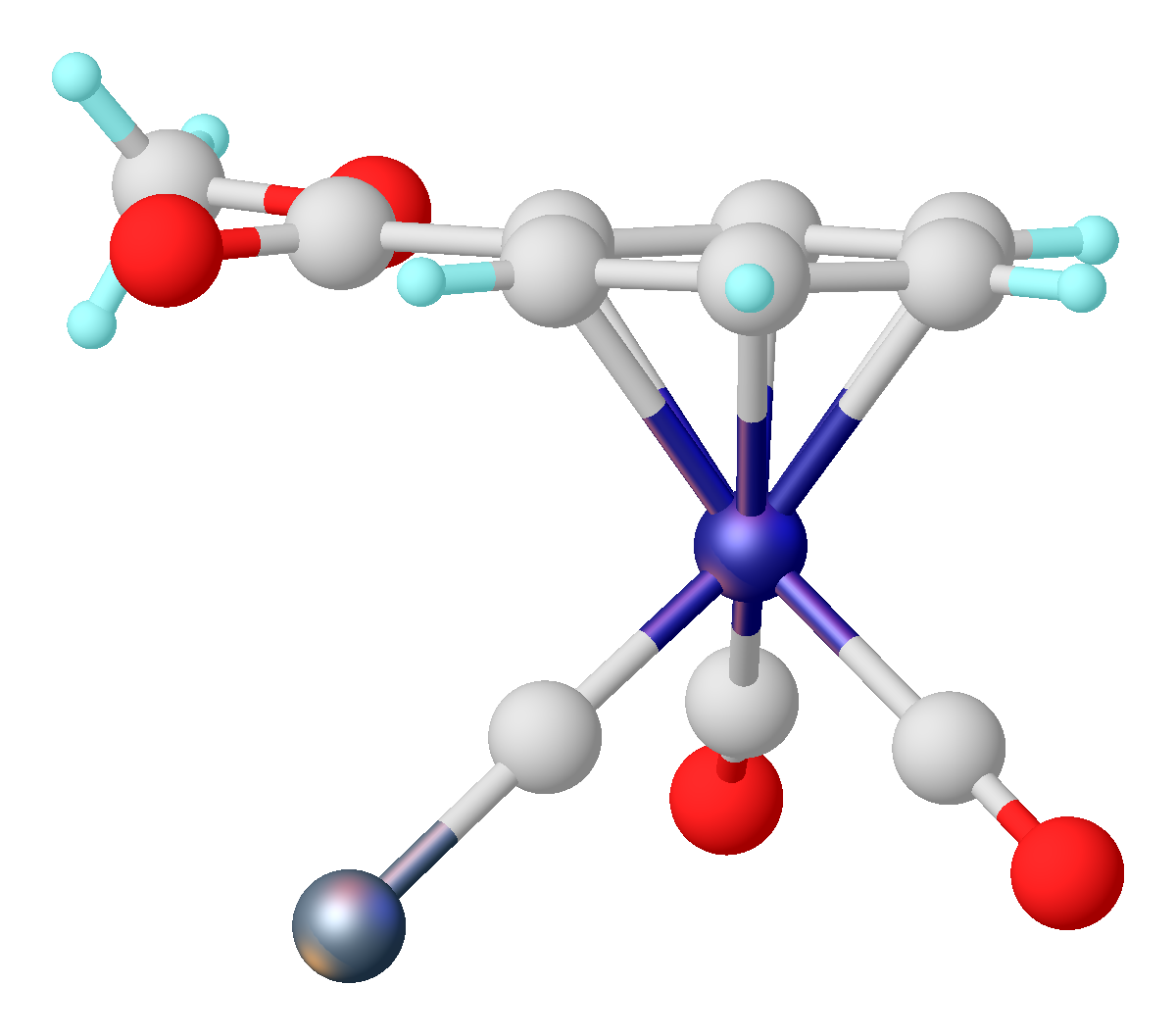
- Filename extension: .mmcif
- Internet media type: chemical/x-mmcif
- Developed by: International Union of Crystallography (IUCr), Protein Data Bank
- Latest release: 5.372; 12 June 2023
- Type of format: chemical file format
- Extended from: Crystallographic Information File
- Website: mmcif.wwpdb.org

The Macromolecular Crystallographic Information File (mmCIF) also known as PDBx/mmCIF is a standard text file format for representing macromolecular structure data, developed by the International Union of Crystallography (IUCr) and the Protein Data Bank. It is an extension of the Crystallographic Information File (CIF), specifically for macromolecular data, such as proteins and nucleic acids, incorporating elements from the PDB file format.

mmCIF is intended as an alternative to the Protein Data Bank (PDB) format and is now the default format used by the Protein Data Bank.

mmCIF was designed to address limitations of the PDB format in terms of capacity and flexibility, especially with the increasing size and complexity of macromolecular structures being determined.

The format is part of the larger Crystallographic Information Framework, a system of exchange protocols based on data dictionaries and relational rules expressible in different machine-readable manifestations, including, but not restricted to, the original Crystallographic Information File and XML.

== Example ==
An example of the mmCIF file format is key-value style is:

_cell.entry_id           4HHB
_cell.length_a           63.150
_cell.length_b           83.590
_cell.length_c           53.800
_cell.angle_alpha        90.00
_cell.angle_beta         99.34
_cell.angle_gamma        90.00
_cell.Z_PDB              4
