= Python License =

Software license

- Author: Corporation for National Research Initiatives
- Latest version: 2.11 and newer
- SPDX identifier: Python-2.0, Python-2.0.1
- FSF approved: Yes
- OSI approved: Yes
- GPL compatible: Some versions
- Copyleft: No

The Python License is a deprecated permissive computer software license created by the Corporation for National Research Initiatives (CNRI). It was used for versions 1.6 and 2.0 of the Python programming language, both released in the year 2000.

The Python License is similar to the BSD License and, while it is a free software license, its wording in some versions meant that it was incompatible with the GNU General Public License (GPL) used by a great deal of free software including the Linux kernel. For this reason CNRI retired the license in 2001, and the license of current releases is the Python Software Foundation License.

== Origin ==
Python was created by Guido van Rossum and the initial copyright was held by his employer, the Centrum Wiskunde & Informatica (CWI). During this time Python was distributed under a GPL-compatible variant of the Historical Permission Notice and Disclaimer license. CNRI obtained ownership of Python when Van Rossum became employed there, and after some years they drafted a new license for the language.

== Retirement ==
The Python License includes a clause stating that the license is governed by the State of Virginia, United States. The Python Software Foundation License; Python 1.6.1 differs from Python 1.6 only in some minor bug fixes and new GPL-compatible licensing terms.
