= Molekel =

- Developer: Swiss National Supercomputing Centre
- Stable release: 5.4 / August 2009; 16 years ago
- Repository: github.com/ugovaretto/molekel
- Operating system: Linux, Microsoft Windows, Mac OS X
- Type: Molecular modelling
- License: GNU General Public License
- Website: ugovaretto.github.io/molekel/

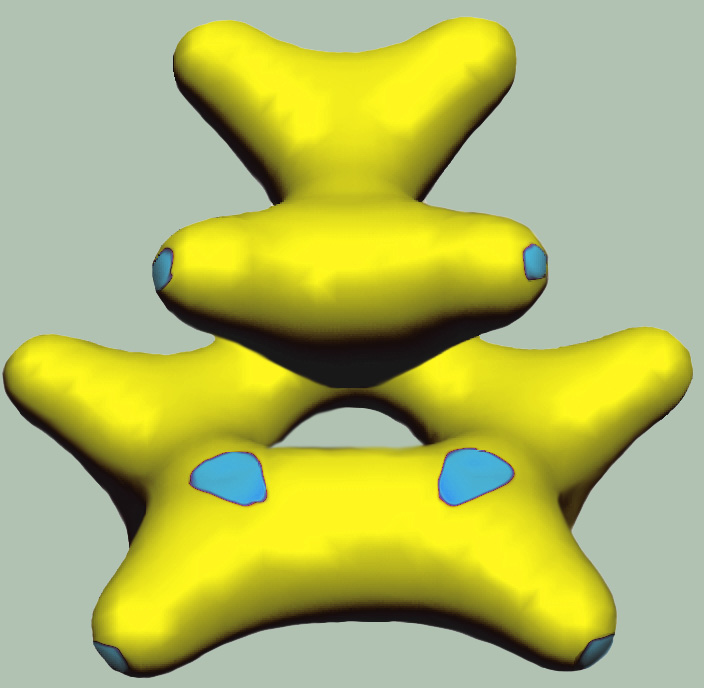
Electron density plot of the norbornyl cation determined using DFT with a mapping of mulliken electrostatic potential- B3LYP/6-31G* in Gaussian03, picture drawn in molekel using Gaussian cube file; Positive charge is colored blue in this picture.

Molekel is a free software multiplatform molecular visualization program. It was originally developed at the University of Geneva by Peter F. Flükiger in the 1990s for Silicon Graphics Computers. In 1998, Stefan Portmann took over responsibility and released Version 3.0. Version 4.0 was a nearly platform independent version. Further developments lead to version 4.3, before Stefan Portmann moved on and ceased to develop the codes. In 2006, Ugo Varetto at the Swiss National Supercomputing Centre (CSCS) restarted the project and version 5.0 was released on 21 December 2006.

Molekel uses VTK and Qwt and therefore as well Qt.

== Major features ==
- Visualization of residues (ribbon or schematic)
- Complete control over the generation of molecular surfaces (bounding box and resolution)
- Visualization of the following surfaces:

- orbitals
- Isosurface from electron density data
- Isosurface from Gaussian cube grid data
- Solvent-accessible surface (SAS)
- Solvent excluded surface (SES)
- Van der Waals radii

- Animation of molecular surfaces
- Export to PostScript or TIFF

== See also ==
- Gabedit
- List of molecular graphics systems
- Molden
- Molecular graphics
- Software for molecular mechanics modeling
- SAMSON
- List of free and open-source software packages
