= RasMol =

Software for the visualisation of macromolecules

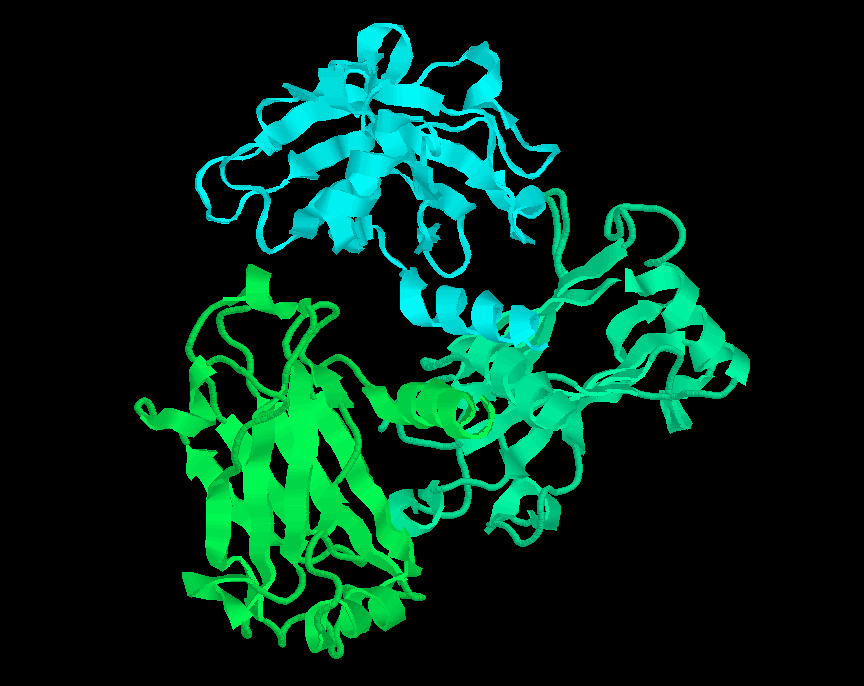
- RasMol ribbon diagram rendering of TRAF2 trimer PDB:1DOA
- Original author: Roger A. Sayle
- Developer: Herbert J. Bernstein
- Initial release: 1992; 34 years ago
- Stable release: 2.7.5.1 / July 17, 2009; 16 years ago
- Written in: C
- Operating system: Unix, Windows
- Platform: IA-32, x86-64
- Available in: English
- Type: Molecular graphics
- License: GPL
- Website: www.rasmol.org
- Repository: sourceforge.net/p/openrasmol/code-0/HEAD/tree/

RasMol is a computer program written for molecular graphics visualization intended and used mainly to depict and explore biological macromolecule structures, such as those found in the Protein Data Bank (PDB).

== History ==
It was originally developed by Roger Sayle in the early 1990s.

Historically, it was an important tool for molecular biologists since the extremely optimized program allowed the software to run on (then) modestly powerful personal computers. Before RasMol, visualization software ran on graphics workstations that, due to their cost, were less accessible to scholars. RasMol continues to be important for research in structural biology, and has become important in education.

RasMol has a complex licensing version history. Starting with the version 2.7 series, RasMol source code is dual-licensed under a GNU General Public License (GPL), or custom license RASLIC. Starting with version 2.7.5, a GPL is the only license valid for binary distributions.

RasMol includes a scripting language, to perform many functions such as selecting certain protein chains, changing colors, etc. Jmol and Sirius software have incorporated this language into their commands.

Protein Data Bank (PDB) files can be downloaded for visualization from members of the Worldwide Protein Data Bank (wwPDB). These have been uploaded by researchers who have characterized the structure of molecules usually by X-ray crystallography, protein NMR spectroscopy, or cryogenic electron microscopy.

== Interprocess communication ==
Rasmol can communicate with other programs via Tcl/Tk on Unix platforms, and via Dynamic Data Exchange (DDE) on Microsoft Windows.

With a multiple sequence alignment program, the responsible Java class can be freely used in other applications.

== See also ==
- List of molecular graphics systems
- Comparison of software for molecular mechanics modeling
- Molecular graphics
- Molecule editor
- List of free and open-source software packages
