= Visual Molecular Dynamics =

Visualization and modelling software

VMD
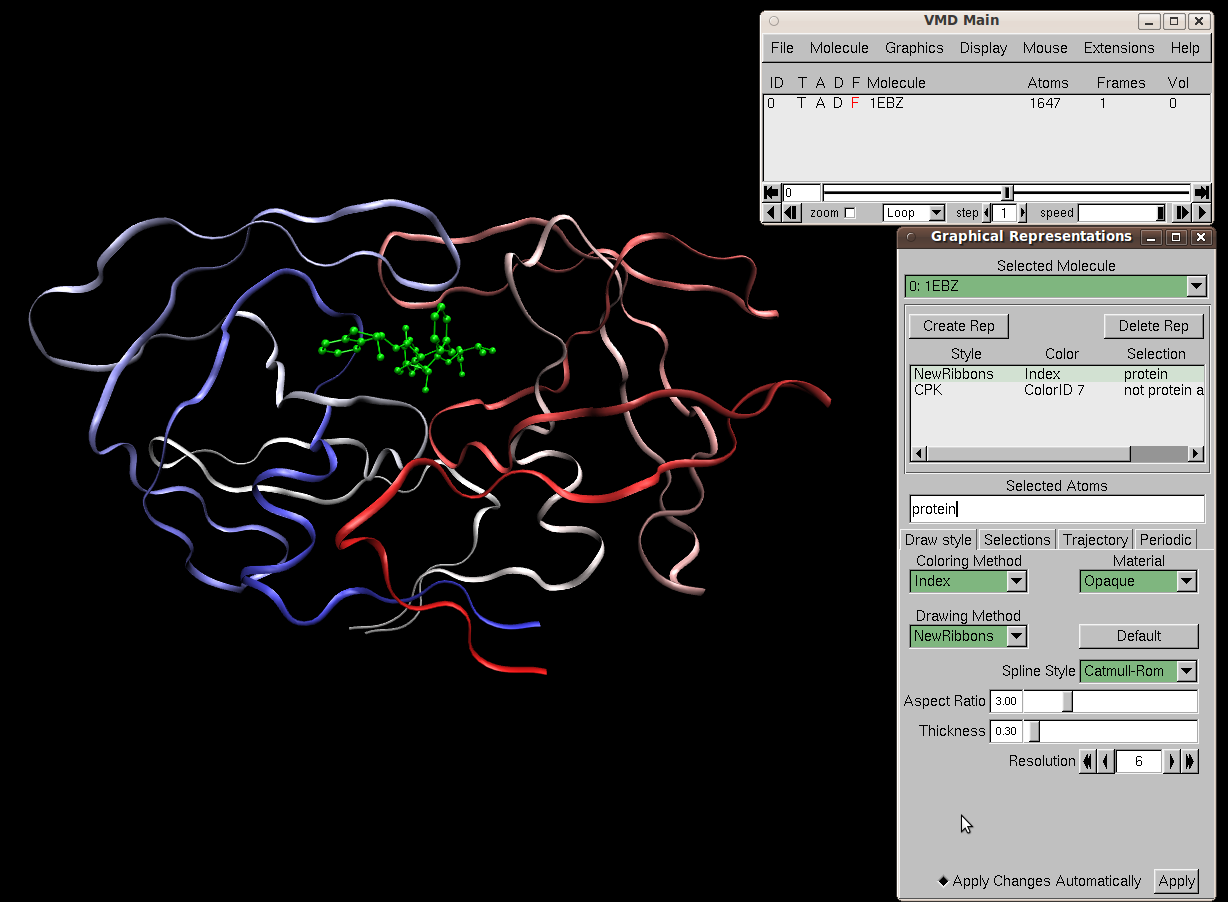
- Screenshot of VMD 1.8.3
- Original authors: William Humphrey, Andrew Dalke, Klaus Schulten, John Stone
- Developer: University of Illinois at Urbana–Champaign
- Initial release: July 4, 1995; 30 years ago
- Stable release: 1.9.3 / 30 November 2016
- Written in: C
- Operating system: macOS, Unix, Windows
- Available in: English
- Type: Molecular modelling
- License: Distribution-specific
- Website: www.ks.uiuc.edu/Research/vmd

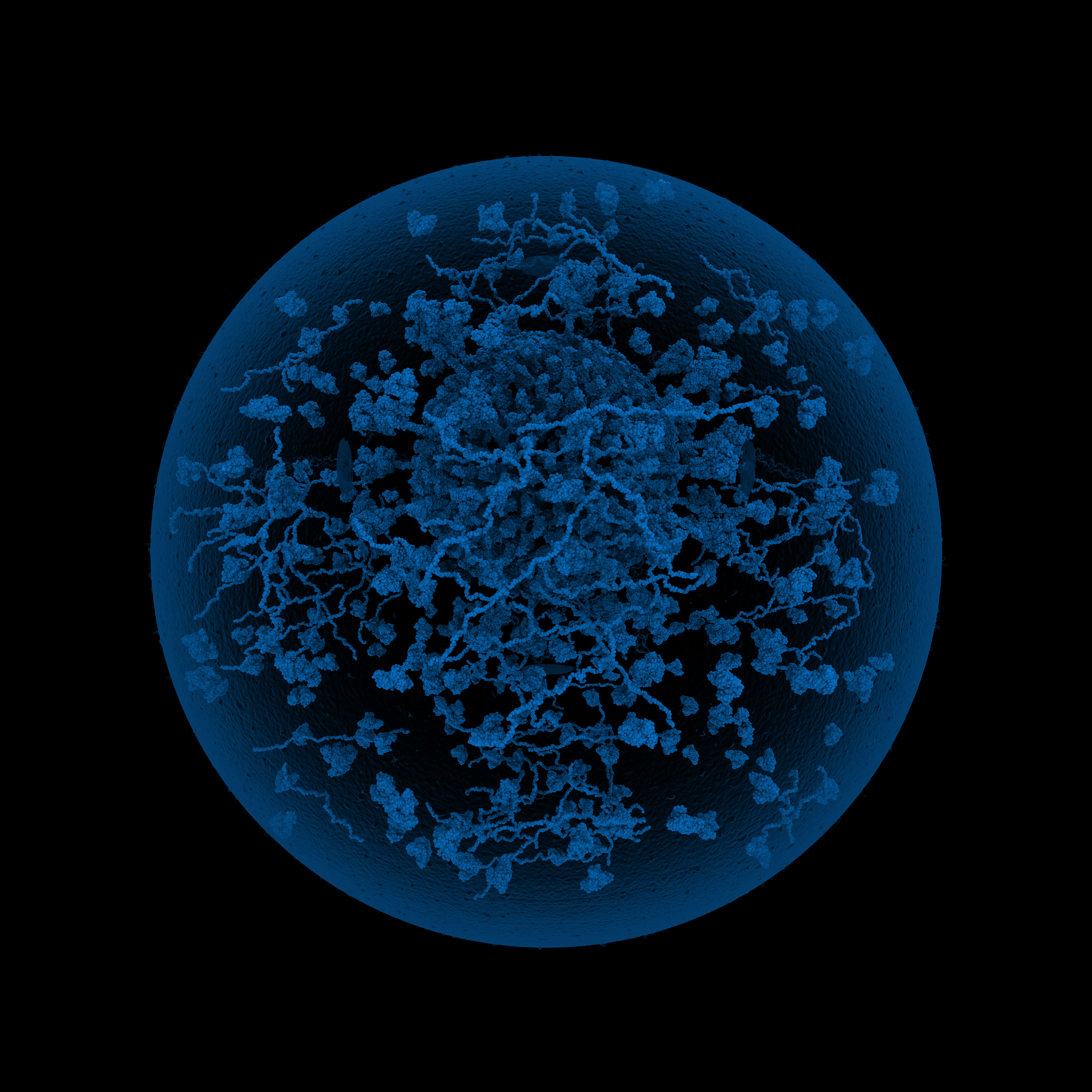
VMD visualization of a 1-billion atom aerosolized SARS-CoV-2 virion, rendered with Tachyon on a workstation with 1TB RAM

Visual Molecular Dynamics (VMD) is a molecular modelling and visualization computer program. VMD is developed mainly as a tool to view and analyze the results of molecular dynamics simulations. It also includes tools for working with volumetric data, sequence data, and arbitrary graphics objects. Molecular scenes can be exported to external rendering tools such as POV-Ray, RenderMan, Tachyon, Virtual Reality Modeling Language (VRML), and many others. Users can run their own Tcl and Python scripts within VMD as it includes embedded Tcl and Python interpreters. VMD runs on Unix, Apple Mac macOS, and Microsoft Windows. VMD is available to non-commercial users under a distribution-specific license which permits both use of the program and modification of its source code, at no charge.

== History ==
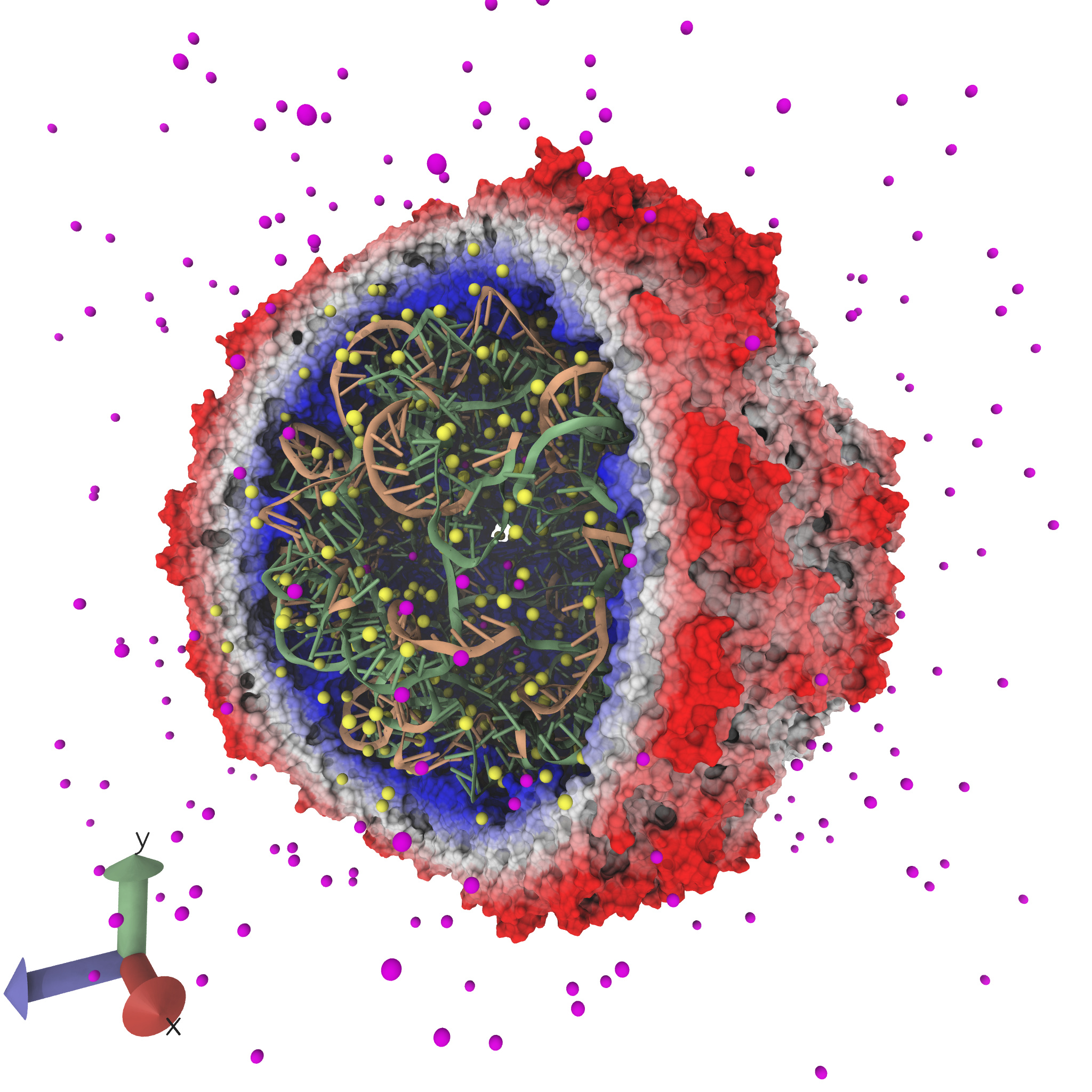
Satellite tobacco mosaic virus molecular graphics produced in VMD and rendered using Tachyon. The scene is shown with a combination molecular surfaces colored by a radial distance, and nucleic acids shown in ribbon representations. The Tachyon rendering uses both direct lighting and ambient occlusion lighting to improve the visibility of pockets and cavities. The VMD axes are shown as a simple example of rendering of non-molecular geometry.

VMD has been developed under the aegis of principal investigator Klaus Schulten in the Theoretical and Computational Biophysics group at the Beckman Institute for Advanced Science and Technology, University of Illinois at Urbana–Champaign. A precursor program, called VRChem, was developed in 1992 by Mike Krogh, William Humphrey, and Rick Kufrin. The initial version of VMD was written by William Humphrey, Andrew Dalke, Ken Hamer, Jon Leech, and James Phillips. It was released in 1995. The earliest versions of VMD were developed for Silicon Graphics workstations and could also run in a cave automatic virtual environment (CAVE) and communicate with a Nanoscale Molecular Dynamics (NAMD) simulation. VMD was further developed by A. Dalke, W. Humphrey, J. Ulrich in 1995–1996, followed by Sergei Izrailev and J. Stone during 1997–1998. In 1998, John Stone became the main VMD developer, porting VMD to many other Unix operating systems and completing the first full-featured OpenGL version. The first version of VMD for the Microsoft Windows platform was released in 1999. In 2001, Justin Gullingsrud, and Paul Grayson, and John Stone added support for haptic feedback devices and further developing the interface between VMD and NAMD for performing interactive molecular dynamics simulations. In subsequent developments, Jordi Cohen, Gullingsrud, and Stone entirely rewrote the graphical user interfaces, added built-in support for display and processing of volumetric data, and the use of OpenGL Shading Language.

== Interprocess communication ==
VMD can communicate with other programs via Tcl/Tk. This communication allows the development of several external plugins that works together with VMD. These plugins increases the set of features and tools of VMD making it one of the most used software in computational chemistry, biology, and biochemistry.

Here is a list of some VMD plugins developed using Tcl/Tk:

- Delphi Force — electrostatic force calculation and visualization
- Pathways Plugin — identify dominant electron transfer pathways and estimate donor-to-acceptor electronic tunneling
- Check Sidechains Plugin — checks and helps select best orientation and protonation state for Asn, Gln, and His side chains
- MultiMSMS Plugin — caches MSMS calculations to speedup the animation of a sequence of frames
- Interactive Essential Dynamics — Interactive visualization of essential dynamics
- Mead Ionize — Improved version of autoionize for highly charged systems
- Andriy Anishkin's VMD Scripts — Many useful VMD scripts for visualization and analysis
- RMSD Trajectory Tool — Development version of RMSD plugin for trajectories
- Clustering Tool — Visualize clusters of conformations of a structure
- iTrajComp — interactive Trajectory Comparison tool
- Swap — Atomic coordinate swapping for improved RMSD alignment
- Intervor — Protein-Protein interface extraction and display
- SurfVol — Measure surface area and volume of proteins
- vmdICE — Plugin for computing RMSD, RMSF, SASA, and other time-varying quantities
- molUP - A VMD plugin to handle QM and ONIOM calculations using the gaussian software
- VMD Store - A VMD extensions that helps users to discover, install, and update other VMD plugins.

== See also ==
- List of molecular graphics systems
- Comparison of software for molecular mechanics modeling
- Molecular dynamics
- Grace (plotting tool)
- Ascalaph Designer
- Tachyon (software)
- VRPN
