= Gabedit =

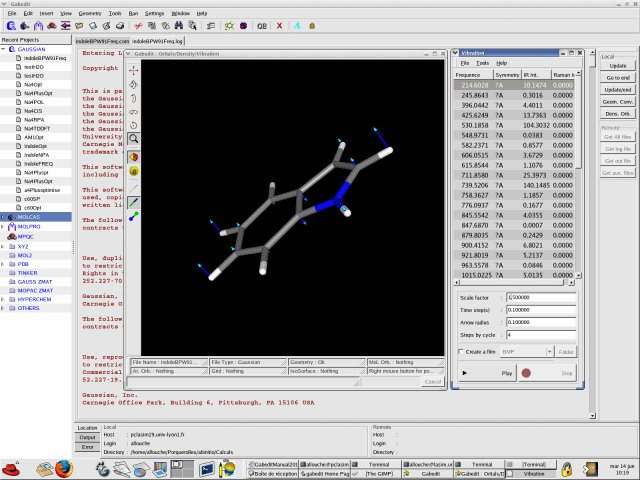
- A screenshot of Gabedit 2.0.1
- Developer(s): A.R. ALLOUCHE
- Stable release: 2.5.1 / July 27, 2021; 4 years ago
- Repository: sourceforge.net/projects/gabedit/
- Operating system: OS Portable (Source code to work with many OS platforms)
- Type: Molecular modelling
- License: MIT License
- Website: gabedit.sourceforge.net

Gabedit is a graphical user interface to GAMESS (US), Gaussian, MOLCAS, MOLPRO, MPQC, OpenMopac, PC GAMESS, ORCA and Q-Chem computational chemistry packages.

== Major features ==
- Builds molecules by atom, ring, group, amino acid and nucleoside.
- Creates an input file for computational chemistry packages.
- Reads output from the ab initio packages, and supports a number of other formats.
- Displays molecular orbitals or electron density as contour plots or 3D grid plots and output to a number of graphical formats.
- Animates molecular vibrations, contours, isosurfaces and rotation.

== See also ==
- List of molecular graphics systems
- PC GAMESS
- ORCA
- Quantum chemistry computer programs
- SAMSON
