= Molden =

- Molden running under Linux, showing the structure of benzene.
- Original author(s): Gijs Schaftenaar
- Initial release: 10 November 1993
- Stable release: 6.9
- Operating system: Windows; OS X Linux
- License: Proprietary
- Website: www.theochem.ru.nl/molden/

Molden is a general molecular and electronic structure processing program.

== Major features ==
- Reads output from the ab initio packages GAMESS (US), Gaussian, MOLPRO, PySCF and from semi-empirical packages such as MOPAC, and supports a number of other formats.
- Displays molecular orbitals or electron density as contour plots or 3D grid plots and output to a number of graphical formats.
- Animates reaction paths and molecular vibrations.
- A Z-matrix editor.

Molden program has been tested on different platforms, namely Linux, Windows NT, Windows95, Windows2000, WindowsXP, MacOSX, Silicon Graphics IRIX, Sun SunOS and Solaris.

Ambfor, the main force field module of Molden, is an external program that can be initialized from Molden. Ambfor admits protein force field Amber and GAFF (General Amber Force Field). Use of Ambfor is automatic when a protein is studied with Molden. The GAFF force field is used only small molecules. Both Amber and GAFF are based on atomic charges. The differences are largely in computational cost, with GAFF being very expensive.

Molden can read several file formats with crystal information.

== See also ==
- List of molecular graphics systems
- List of software for molecular mechanics modeling
- CMBI
