= JOELib =

- JOELib2 logo, which is the word JOELib written in the fictional Tengwar script of J. R. R. Tolkien, followed by a Roman numeral 2.
- Original author: Joerg Kurt Wegner
- Developer: JOELib development team
- Initial release: 9 November 2001; 24 years ago
- Stable release: 2007-03-03 / 3 March 2007; 18 years ago
- Preview release: 2009-06-08 / 8 June 2009; 16 years ago
- Repository: sourceforge.net/p/joelib/svn/HEAD/tree/
- Written in: Java
- Operating system: Cross-platform: Windows, Unix, Linux, macOS
- Platform: IA-32, x86-64
- Available in: English
- Type: Cheminformatics, molecular modelling
- License: GPL 2.0
- Website: sourceforge.net/projects/joelib

JOELib is computer software, a chemical expert system used mainly to interconvert chemical file formats. Because of its strong relationship to informatics, this program belongs more to the category cheminformatics than to molecular modelling. It is available for Windows, Unix and other operating systems supporting the programming language Java. It is free and open-source software distributed under the GNU General Public License (GPL) 2.0.

== History ==
JOELib and OpenBabel were derived from the OELib Cheminformatics library.

== Logo ==
The project logo is just the word JOELib in the Tengwar script of J. R. R. Tolkien. The letters are grouped as JO-E-Li-b. Vowels are usually grouped together with a consonant, but two following vowels must be separated by a helper construct.

== Major features ==
- Chemical expert system
- Query and substructure search (based on Simplified molecular-input line-entry system (SMARTS), a SMILES extension
- Clique detection
- QSAR
  - Data mining
  - Molecule mining, special case of Structured Data Mining
- Feature–descriptor calculation
  - Partition coefficient, log P
  - Rule-of-five
  - Partial charges
  - Fingerprint calculation
  - etc.
- Chemical file formats
  - Chemical table file: MDL Molfile, SD format
  - SMILES
  - Gaussian
  - Chemical Markup Language
  - MOPAC

== See also ==
- OpenBabel - C++ version of JOELib-OELib
- Jmol
- Chemistry Development Kit (CDK)
- Comparison of software for molecular mechanics modeling
- Blue Obelisk
- Molecule editor
- List of free and open-source software packages
