= ISIS/Draw =

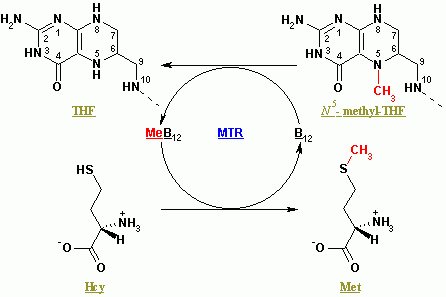
An example of a diagram drawn using ISIS/Draw

ISIS/Draw was a chemical structure drawing program developed by MDL Information Systems. It introduced a number of file formats for the storage of chemical information that have become industry standards.

== History ==
Molecular Design Limited (MDL) was founded by Stuart Marson and W. Todd Wipke in 1978, following the latter's experience with E. J. Corey in developing software for planning organic syntheses. The company developed software to store and search chemical structures in large databases under the brand name MACCS (Molecular ACCess System), which was targeted at pharmaceutical and agrochemical companies. MDL offered their ISIS (Integrated Scientific Information System) products including ISIS/Draw as components of the MACCS system, specifically to allow chemists to use a graphical interface to register new compounds into corporate databases and to search these databases by structure or part-structure. They also introduced ISIS/Base, a chemical database program suited to the storage of relatively small numbers of structures with associated data for personal use independently of corporate systems. ISIS/Draw structures could be incorporated into other documents, for example using the word processor software which was becoming available in the 1980s, hence providing full electronic publishing for chemists. MDL released many versions of the software and made ISIS/Draw freely available for non-commercial use: version 2.5 was available to run on Windows 98. By 2007, MDL (then owned by Reed Elsevier) merged with Symyx Technologies, which in turn was acquired by Accelrys in 2010 and is now owned by Dassault Systèmes. The software is now branded as BIOVIA Draw.

== File formats ==
MDL introduced specifications for chemical file formats, including the molfile (.mol), and structure/data file (.sdf) which were subsequently placed in the public domain and have become standards for representing structures in 2-D drawings and for transferring such information with associated data, for example identifiers, chemical names and substance properties. Many public databases implemented these standards and ChemSpider, for example, allows users to download molfiles for the structures it holds. ISIS/Draw retained its own proprietary file formats with the extension .skc (sketch file) and .rxn (for reactions) and because of its role in preparing database queries it supported a variety of special atom and bond types used for substructure searching, such as wildcard atoms, aromatic bonds, ring bonds, and the atom mapping required for reaction searches.

== Program features ==
While ISIS/Draw was mainly a 2D drawing program, it had some 3D rotation features and could interface with Rasmol for 3D visualization and rendering. ISIS/Draw also included structure and reaction validation features and could calculate elementary properties such as formula and molecular weight. It had an "AutoNom" add-in that allowed the creation of IUPAC names for valid structures and could use a special "pseudoatom" to generate amino-acid sequences for proteins.

One important feature of the MACCS system and ISIS/Draw was that it had comprehensive facilities, using hatched and wedged bonds, to represent relative or absolute stereochemistry and chirality and to recognise cis–trans isomerism in double bonds. In this respect it was superior to Wiswesser line notation which had hitherto been used to create searchable databases. Likewise, while SMILES notation can handle stereochemistry in some implementations it is more difficult for non-specialists to encode their structures in that way than by drawing them.

== Current implementation ==
The current (2020) implementation of the software is called BIOVIA Draw and has several new features such as support for reading and writing International Chemical Identifiers (InChi) and converting IUPAC names into structure drawings. It is freely available for academic and non-commercial use.

== See also ==
- MDL Chime
- Molecule editor
