= Bicyclohexyl =

- Structural formula of bicyclohexyl

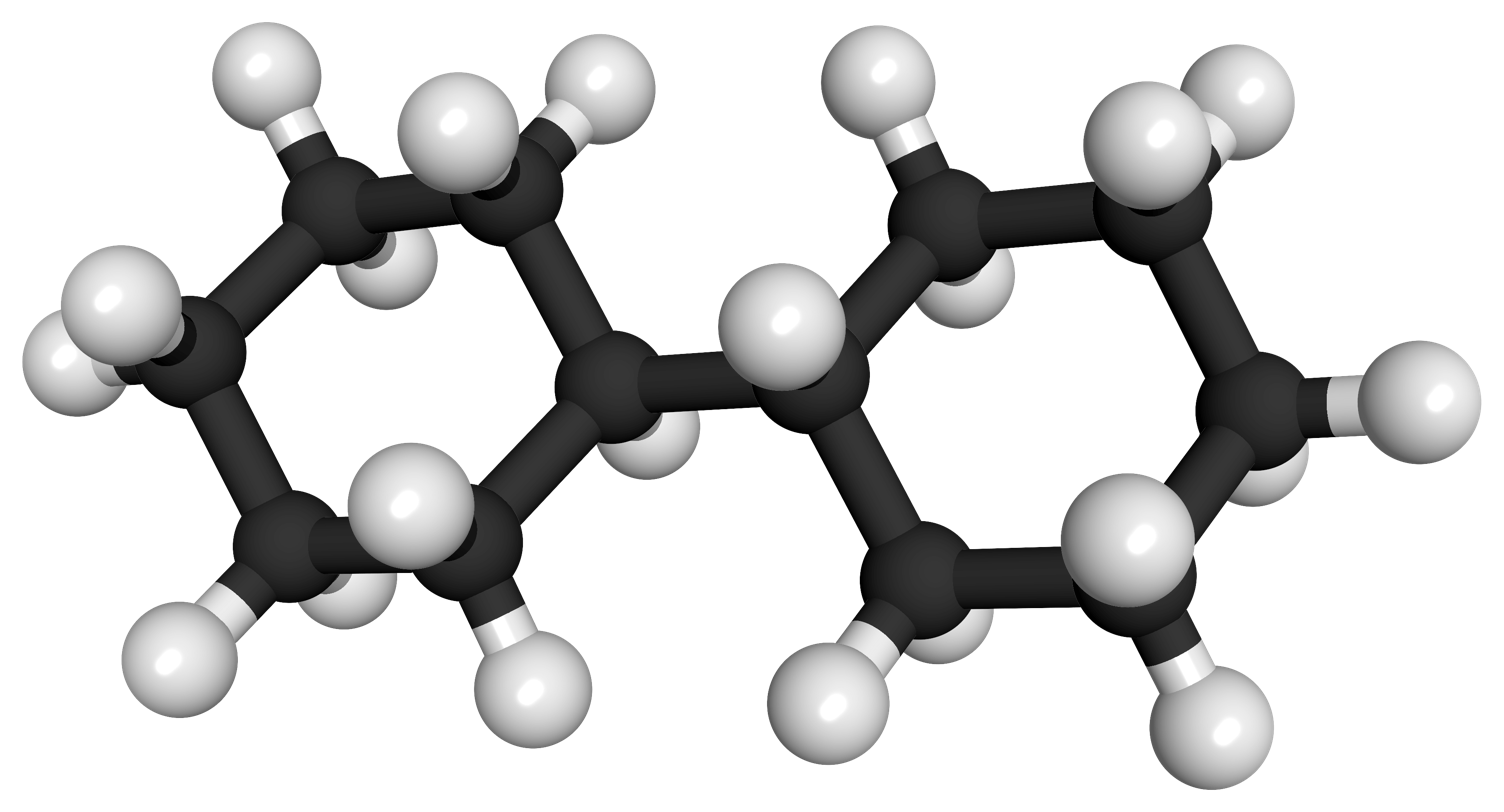
- 3D ball-and-stick structure of bicyclohexyl

Names
- Preferred IUPAC name 1,1′-Bi(cyclohexane)
- Other names: 1,1′-Bicyclohexyl; Bicyclohexane; Dicyclohexyl; Cyclohexylcyclohexane

Identifiers
CAS Number	92-51-3
3D model (JSmol)	Interactive image
ChEMBL	ChEMBL1231413
ChemSpider	6827
ECHA InfoCard	100.001.966
EC Number	202-161-4
PubChem CID	7094
UNII	Y77501141O
CompTox Dashboard (EPA)	DTXSID8021802
- InChI: InChI=1S/C12H22/c1-3-7-11(8-4-1)12-9-5-2-6-10-12/h11-12H,1-10H2 Key: WVIIMZNLDWSIRH-UHFFFAOYSA-N
- SMILES: C1CCC(CC1)C2CCCCC2

Properties
Chemical formula	C_{12}H_{22}
Molar mass	166.308 g·mol^{−1}
Appearance	Colorless liquid
Density	0.88273 g/cm^{3}
Melting point	4 °C (39 °F; 277 K)
Solubility in water	Insoluble
Solubility in other solvents	Miscible with organic solvents
Refractive index (n_{D})	1.4796

Hazards
- GHS labelling
Pictograms	(GHS07: Exclamation mark) (GHS09: Environmental hazard)
Signal word	Warning
Hazard statements	H315, H319, H410
Precautionary statements	P264, P273, P280, P302+P352, P305+P351+P338, P321, P332+P313, P337+P313, P362, P391, P501
Flash point	92 °C (198 °F; 365 K)
Autoignition temperature	245 °C (473 °F; 518 K)
- Except where otherwise noted, data are given for materials in their standard state (at 25 °C [77 °F], 100 kPa). Infobox references

Bicyclohexyl, also known as dicyclohexyl or bicyclohexane, is an organic chemical with the formula C_{12}H_{22}, consisting of two cyclohexane rings joined by a single carbon-carbon bond. It is a nonvolatile liquid at room temperature, with a boiling point of 227 °C (441 °F).

== Production ==
Carbazole can be denitrogenated by hydrogen to yield bicyclohexyl as the main product.

When cyclohexane is exposed to radiation, bicyclohexyl is produced among other hydrocarbons.

== Properties ==
In addition to the conformation of each cyclohexane—generally found as a chair—there is conformational variability at the linkage between them. Liquid bicyclohexyl contains a mixture of molecules with C_{2h} and C_{2} symmetry, termed ee anti and ee gauche, respectively. The link between the two rings has a bond length of 1.55 Å whereas the carbon-carbon length in the rings is around 1.535 Å.

The speed of sound in bicyclohexyl is 1441.51 m/s, higher than many other hydrocarbons. The density is 882.73 kgm^{−1}. The isothermal compressibility is 674 TPa^{−1} and isobaric expansivity is 819 K^{−1}.

When bicyclohexyl is heated to around 427 °C (801 °F) it slowly decomposes to cyclohexane and cyclohexene, as the pivot bond joining the two rings is the longest and weakest one.

Heat of combustion is 1814.8 kcal/mol.

== Use ==
Bicyclohexyl has uses in organic synthesis as a building block and structural motif, in studying the chemistry of liquid interfaces, and in surface modification of metal oxides as a solvent.

== See also ==
- Biphenyl
