= JME Molecule Editor =

Molecule editor Java applet

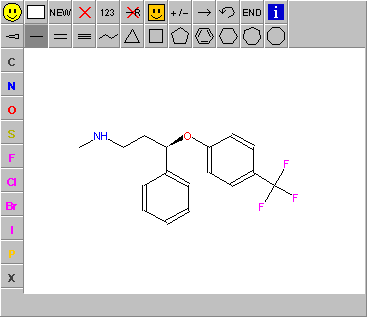
- Molecule displayed with JME Molecular Editor
- Original author(s): Peter Ertl
- Developer(s): Comenius University in Bratislava; Ciba-Geigy, Novartis; Basel
- Initial release: 1997; 28 years ago
- Final release: 2012.05 / May 2012; 13 years ago
- Written in: Java
- Operating system: Cross-platform
- Platform: Java
- Successor: JSME
- Available in: English
- Type: Molecule editor
- License: Proprietary freeware
- Website: www.molinspiration.com/jme

The JME Molecule Editor is a molecule editor Java applet with which users make and edit drawings of molecules and reactions (including generating substructure queries), and can display molecules within an HTML page. The editor can generate Daylight simplified molecular-input line-entry system (SMILES) or MDL Molfiles of the created structures.

The JME Editor was written by Peter Ertl while at Comenius University in Bratislava, and then at Ciba-Geigy, later merged with Sandoz Laboratories, to form Novartis International AG, in Basel, Switzerland.

It is released as freeware for noncommercial use and has become a standard for molecular-structure input on the web.

== JSME ==
JSME Molecule Editor
- Original author(s): Peter Ertl, Bruno Bienfait
- Developer(s): Novartis Institutes for Biomedical Research; Basel
- Initial release: 2013; 12 years ago
- Stable release: 2017-02-26 / February 26, 2017; 8 years ago
- Written in: JavaScript
- Operating system: Cross-platform
- Platform: Web browser
- Predecessor: JME
- Available in: English
- Type: Molecule editor
- License: Open-source BSD
- Website: peter-ertl.com/jsme

JME has been ported to JavaScript using the Google Web Toolkit (GWT). In analogy to JME, the JavaScript version is named JSME. Its interface is almost identical to that of JME, although some cosmetic options are available. It is released as free and open-source software under a 3-clause BSD license in the form of minified JavaScript produced by GWT.

As of February 2017, JSME is capable of SMILES, MOL (original and V3000), InChI (and key), and SVG export.

== See also ==
- Molecule editor
- Cheminformatics
- Comparison of software for molecular mechanics modeling

== Notes ==
1. Interesting cheminformatics services using the JME editor
2. List of institutions using JME applet
