= Ghemical =

Computational chemistry software package

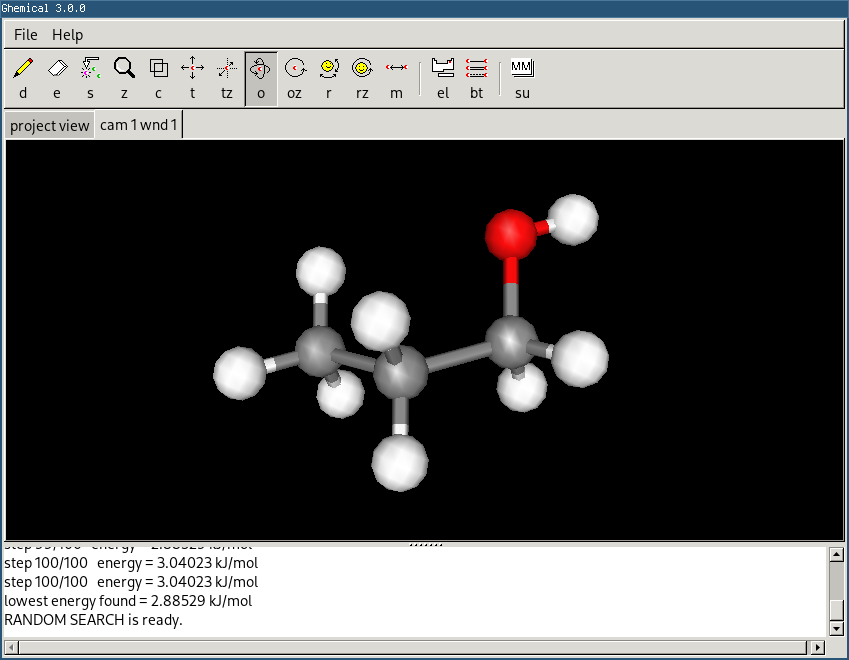
- A screenshot of Ghemical 3.0.0
- Developer: Ghemical authors
- Initial release: 11 April 2000; 25 years ago
- Stable release: 2.0.0 / 2006; 20 years ago
- Written in: C++
- Operating system: Unix-like
- Available in: ?
- Type: Computational chemistry
- License: GPL
- Website: http://bioinformatics.org/ghemical
- Repository: http://bioinformatics.org/cgi-bin/cvsweb.cgi/libghemical/

Ghemical is a computational chemistry software package written in C++ and released under the GNU General Public License. The program has graphical user interface based on GTK+2 and supports quantum mechanical and molecular mechanic models, with geometry optimization, molecular dynamics, and a large set of visualization tools. Ghemical relies on external code to provide the quantum-mechanical calculations — MOPAC provides the semi-empirical MNDO, MINDO, AM1, and PM3 methods, and MPQC methods based on Hartree–Fock calculations.

The chemical expert system is based on OpenBabel, which provides basis functionality like atom typing, rotamer generation and import/export of chemical file formats.

== See also ==
- Open Babel — chemical expert system
- XDrawChem — 2D drawing program, also based on Open Babel
- Molecule editor
- Avogadro (software)
