= Chemical file format =

File format that stores chemical formulae and structures

A chemical file format is a type of data file which is used specifically for depicting molecular data. One of the most widely used is the chemical table file format, which is similar to Structure Data Format (SDF) files. They are text files that represent multiple chemical structure records and associated data fields. The XYZ file format is a simple format that usually gives the number of atoms in the first line, a comment on the second, followed by a number of lines with atomic symbols (or atomic numbers) and cartesian coordinates. The Protein Data Bank Format is commonly used for proteins but is also used for other types of molecules. There are many other types which are detailed below. Various software systems are available to convert from one format to another.

== Distinguishing formats ==
Chemical information is usually provided as files or streams and many formats have been created, with varying degrees of documentation. The format is indicated in three ways:

- file extension (usually 3 letters). This is widely used, but fragile as common suffixes such as .mol and .dat are used by many systems, including non-chemical ones.
- self-describing files where the format information is included in the file. Examples are CIF and CML.
- chemical MIME type added by a chemically aware server. (see § The Chemical MIME Project)

== Chemical Markup Language ==
Chemical Markup Language (CML) is an open standard for representing molecular and other chemical data. The open source project includes XML Schema, source code for parsing and working with CML data, and an active community. The articles Tools for Working with Chemical Markup Language and XML for Chemistry and Biosciences discusses CML in more detail. CML data files are accepted by many tools, including JChemPaint, Jmol, XDrawChem and MarvinView.

== Connectivity-only formats ==
Simpler chemical format focus on describing the connectivity of atoms (and sometimes their stereochemistry). They include:

=== InChI ===
InChI is an IUPAC-standard format for describing molecules. Multiple InChI strings can be joined into an "RInChI" to describe a chemical reaction, or into a "MInChI" to describe a mixture.

=== SMILES ===
The simplified molecular input line entry system, or SMILES, is a line notation for molecules. SMILES strings include connectivity but do not include 2D or 3D coordinates.

Hydrogen atoms are not represented. Other atoms are represented by their element symbols B, C, N, O, F, P, S, Cl, Br, and I. The symbol = represents double bonds and # represents triple bonds. Branching is indicated by ( ). Rings are indicated by pairs of digits.

Some examples are

Name	Formula	SMILES string
Methane	CH_{4}	C
Ethanol	C_{2}H_{6}O	CCO
Benzene	C_{6}H_{6}	C1=CC=CC=C1 or c1ccccc1
Ethylene	C_{2}H_{4}	C=C
Acetic acid	C_{2}H_{4}O_{2}	CC(=O)O

Multiple SMILES strings can be joined into a "reaction SMILES", which describes a chemical reaction.

=== SYBYL Line Notation ===
SYBYL Line Notation (SLN) is a chemical line notation. Based on SMILES, it incorporates a complete syntax for specifying relative stereochemistry. SLN has a rich query syntax that allows for the specification of Markush structure queries. The syntax also supports the specification of combinatorial libraries of ChemDraw.

Example SLNs
Description	SLN string
Benzene	C[1]H:CH:CH:CH:CH:CH:@1
Alanine	NH2C[s=n]H(CH3)C(=O)OH
Query showing R sidechain	R1[hac>1]C[1]:C:C:C:C:C:@1
Query for amide/sulfamide	NHC=M1{M1:O,S}

== Coordinate formats ==
Some chemical formats describe the coordinates of atoms. This is important for

- knowing the 3D structure of molecules and for simulating their behavior.
- maintaining the layout of 2D molecule drawings

=== Chemical table formats ===
One of the most widely used industry standards are the chemical table file formats. They are text files that adhere to a strict format for representing multiple chemical structure records and associated data fields. The format was originally developed and published by Molecular Design Limited (MDL). This family includes the MOLfile, the SDfile (Structure Data Format, MOLfile with metadata), the RXNfile (multiple MOLfiles put together to describe a chemical reaction), and RDfile (RXNfile with metadata).

=== Protein Data Bank Format ===
The Protein Data Bank Format is an obsolete format for protein structures developed in 1972. It is a fixed-width format and thus limited to a maximum number of atoms, residues, and chains; this resulted in splitting very large structures such as ribosomes into multiple files. For example, the E. coli 70S was represented as 4 PDB files in 2009: 3I1M, 3I1N, 3I1O, and 3I1P. In 2014, they were consolidated into a single file, 4V6C.

Some PDB files contained an optional section describing atom connectivity as well as position. Because these files were sometimes used to describe macromolecular assemblies or molecules represented in explicit solvent, they could grow very large and were often compressed. Some tools, such as Jmol and KiNG, could read PDB files in gzipped format. The wwPDB maintained the specifications of the PDB file format and its XML alternative, PDBML. There was a fairly major change in PDB format specification (to version 3.0) in August 2007, and a remediation of many file problems in the existing database. The typical file extension for a PDB file was .pdb, although some older files used .ent or .brk. Some molecular modeling tools wrote nonstandard PDB-style files that adapted the basic format to their own needs.

==== GROMACS format ====
The GROMACS file format family was created for use with the molecular simulation software package GROMACS. It closely resembles the PDB format but was designed for storing output from molecular dynamics simulations, so it allows for additional numerical precision and optionally retains information about particle velocity as well as position at a given point in the simulation trajectory. It does not allow for the storage of connectivity information, which in GROMACS is obtained from separate molecule and system topology files. The typical file extension for a GROMACS file is .gro.

==== CHARMM format ====
The CHARMM molecular dynamics package can read and write a number of standard chemical and biochemical file formats; however, the CARD (coordinate) and PSF (protein structure file) are largely unique to CHARMM. The CARD format is fixed-column-width, resembles the PDB format, and is used exclusively for storing atomic coordinates. The PSF file contains atomic connectivity information (which describes atomic bonds) and is required before beginning a simulation. The typical file extensions used are .crd and .psf respectively.

=== mmCIF format ===
In 2014, the PDB format was officially replaced with mmCIF. mmCIF is a new text format for representing atomic coordinates and "biological assemblies", i.e. assemblies of molecules. It can express things that the PDB format cannot express, so some newer PDB structures may not have PDB files available (but a "bundle file" containing PDB files split from the main mmCIF file can be downloaded).

There is also a more verbose XML variant.

=== GSD format ===
The General Simulation Data (GSD) file format created for efficient reading / writing of generic particle simulations, primarily - but not restricted to - those from HOOMD-blue. The package also contains a python module that reads and writes HOOMD schema gsd files with an easy-to-use syntax.

=== Ghemical file format ===
The Ghemical software can use OpenBabel to import and export a number of file formats. However, by default, it uses the GPR format. This file is composed of several parts, separated by a tag (!Header, !Info, !Atoms, !Bonds, !Coord, !PartialCharges and !End).

=== XYZ ===
The XYZ file format is a simple format that usually gives the number of atoms in the first line, a comment on the second, followed by a number of lines with atomic symbols (or atomic numbers) and cartesian coordinates.

== Other common formats ==
PubChem offers data export for SDF, JSON, XML, and ASNT/B formats.

=== Database references ===
These "formats" are references to entries in specific databases. Examples include:

- The MDL number contains a unique identification number for each reaction and variation. The format is RXXXnnnnnnnn. R indicates a reaction, XXX indicates which database contains the reaction record. The numeric portion, nnnnnnnn, is an 8-digit number.
- The InChIKey is derived from crytographic hashes of parts of an InChI. The same InChI always give the same key.
- PubChem, ChEBI, KEGG etc. each have numeric entry numbers.

=== Container formats ===
These formats wrap other formats.

==== Mixfile ====
The Mixfile format is a JSON-based format for describing mixtures.

== The Chemical MIME Project ==
Just like extension names are used to distinguish file types in folders, MIME types are used to distinguish data-stream types on the Internet. "Chemical MIME" is a project for proposing MIME types to chemical streams.

This project started in January 1994, and was first announced during the Chemistry workshop at the First WWW International Conference, held at CERN in May 1994. ... The first version of an Internet draft was published during May–October 1994, and the second revised version during April–September 1995. A paper presented to the CPEP (Committee on Printed and Electronic Publications) at the IUPAC meeting in August 1996 is available for discussion.

In 1998 the work was formally published in the JCIM.

File extension	MIME Type	Proper Name	Description
.alc	chemical/x-alchemy	Alchemy Format	
.csf	chemical/x-cache-csf	CAChe MolStruct CSF	
.cbin, .cascii, .ctab	chemical/x-cactvs-binary	CACTVS format	
.cdx	chemical/x-cdx	ChemDraw eXchange file	
.cer	chemical/x-cerius	MSI Cerius II format	
.c3d	chemical/x-chem3d	Chem3D Format	
.chm	chemical/x-chemdraw	ChemDraw file	
.cif	chemical/x-cif	Crystallographic Information File, Crystallographic Information Framework	Promulgated by the International Union of Crystallography
.cmdf	chemical/x-cmdf	CrystalMaker Data format	
.cml	chemical/x-cml	Chemical Markup Language	XML based Chemical Markup Language.
.cpa	chemical/x-compass	Compass program of the Takahashi	
.bsd	chemical/x-crossfire	Crossfire file	
.csm, .csml	chemical/x-csml	Chemical Style Markup Language	
.ctx	chemical/x-ctx	Gasteiger group CTX file format	
.cxf, .cef	chemical/x-cxf	Chemical eXchange Format	
.emb, .embl	chemical/x-embl-dl-nucleotide	EMBL Nucleotide Format	
.spc	chemical/x-galactic-spc	SPC format for spectral and chromatographic data	
.inp, .gam, .gamin	chemical/x-gamess-input	GAMESS Input format	
.fch, .fchk	chemical/x-gaussian-checkpoint	Gaussian Checkpoint Format	
.cub	chemical/x-gaussian-cube	Gaussian Cube (Wavefunction) Format	
.gau, .gjc, .gjf, .com	chemical/x-gaussian-input	Gaussian Input Format	
.gcg	chemical/x-gcg8-sequence	Protein Sequence Format	
.gen	chemical/x-genbank	GenBank Format	Not a general-purpose chemical format, but one that focuses on biological macromolecule sequences
	application/x-ghemical	Ghemical format	
.istr, .ist	chemical/x-isostar	IsoStar Library of Intermolecular Interactions	
.jdx, .dx	chemical/x-jcamp-dx	JCAMP Spectroscopic Data Exchange Format	
.kin	chemical/x-kinemage	Kinetic (Protein Structure) Images; Kinemage	
.mcm	chemical/x-macmolecule	MacMolecule File Format	
.mmd, .mmod	chemical/x-macromodel-input	MacroModel Molecular Mechanics	
.mol	chemical/x-mdl-molfile	MDL Molfile	
.smiles, .smi	chemical/x-daylight-smiles	Simplified molecular input line entry specification	A line notation for molecules.
.sdf	chemical/x-mdl-sdfile	Structure-Data File	
.el	chemical/x-sketchel	SketchEl Molecule	
.ds	chemical/x-datasheet	SketchEl XML DataSheet	
.inchi	chemical/x-inchi	IUPAC International Chemical Identifier (InChI)	
.jsd, .jsdraw	chemical/x-jsdraw	JSDraw native file format	
.helm, .ihelm	chemical/x-helm	Pistoia Alliance HELM string	A line notation for biological molecules
.xhelm	chemical/x-xhelm	Pistoia Alliance XHELM XML file	XML based HELM including monomer definitions

=== Support ===
For Linux/Unix, configuration files are available as a "chemical-mime-data" package in .deb, RPM and tar.gz formats to register chemical MIME types on a web server. Programs can then register as viewer, editor or processor for these formats so that full support for chemical MIME types is available.

== Converting between formats ==
OpenBabel and JOELib are freely available open source tools specifically designed for converting between file formats. Their chemical expert systems support a large atom type conversion tables.

obabel -i input_format input_file -o output_format output_file

For example, to convert the file epinephrine.sdf in SDF to CML use the command

obabel -i sdf epinephrine.sdf -o cml epinephrine.cml

The resulting file is epinephrine.cml.

IOData is a free and open-source Python library for parsing, storing, and converting various file formats commonly used by quantum chemistry, molecular dynamics, and plane-wave density-functional-theory software programs. It also supports a flexible framework for generating input files for various software packages. For a complete list of supported formats, please go to https://iodata.readthedocs.io/en/latest/formats.html.

A number of tools intended for viewing and editing molecular structures are able to read in files in a number of formats and write them out in other formats. The tools JChemPaint (based on the Chemistry Development Kit), XDrawChem (based on OpenBabel), Chime, Jmol, Mol2mol and Discovery Studio fit into this category.

== Sources of chemical data ==
Here is a short list of sources of freely available molecular data. There are many more resources than listed here out there on the Internet. Links to these sources are given in the references below.

Small molecules:

1. The US National Institute of Health PubChem database is a huge source of chemical data. All entries have two-dimensional data, with a few having 3D conformer data available. Data includes SDF, SMILES, InChI, PubChem XML, and PubChem ASN1 formats.
2. eMolecules is a commercial database for molecular data. The data includes a two-dimensional structure diagram and a smiles string for each compound. eMolecules supports fast substructure searching based on parts of the molecular structure.
3. ChemExper is a commercial data base for molecular data. The search results include a two-dimensional structure diagram and a mole file for many compounds.
4. New York University Library of 3-D Molecular Structures.
5. The US Environmental Protection Agency's The Distributed Structure-Searchable Toxicity (DSSTox) Database Network is a project of EPA's Computational Toxicology Program. The database provides SDF molecular files with a focus on carcinogenic and otherwise toxic substances.

Macromolecules:

1. The worldwide Protein Data Bank (wwPDB) is an excellent source of protein and nucleic acid molecular coordinate data. The data is three-dimensional and provided in Protein Data Bank (PDB) format.
2. Databases for predicted protein and nucleic acid structures such as AlphaFold Protein Structure Database and Swiss-Model also provide PDB format download.

== See also ==
- File format
- OpenBabel, JOELib, OELib
- Chemistry Development Kit
- Chemical Markup Language
- Software for molecular modeling
- NCI/CADD Chemical Identifier Resolver
