= PubChem =

Chemical information database

Content
- Description: Chemicals and their bioassays
- Organisms: Humans and other animals

Contact
- Research center: NCBI
- Primary citation: PMID 15879180

Access
- Website: pubchem.ncbi.nlm.nih.gov
- Download URL: FTP
- Web service URL: PUG-View

Miscellaneous
- License: Public domain

PubChem is a database of chemical molecules and their activities against biological assays. The system is maintained by the National Center for Biotechnology Information (NCBI), a component of the National Library of Medicine, which is part of the United States National Institutes of Health (NIH). PubChem can be accessed for free through a web user interface. Millions of compound structures and descriptive datasets can be freely downloaded via FTP. PubChem contains multiple substance descriptions and small molecules with fewer than 100 atoms and 1,000 bonds. More than 80 database vendors contribute to the growing PubChem database.

== History ==
PubChem was released in 2004 as a component of the Molecular Libraries Program (MLP) of the NIH. As of November 2015, PubChem contains more than 150 million depositor-provided substance descriptions, 60 million unique chemical structures, and 225 million biological activity test results (from over 1 million assay experiments performed on more than 2 million small-molecules covering almost 10,000 unique protein target sequences that correspond to more than 5,000 genes). It also contains RNA interference (RNAi) screening assays that target over 15,000 genes.

As of August 2018, PubChem contains 247.3 million substance descriptions, 96.5 million unique chemical structures, contributed by 629 data sources from 40 countries. It also contains 237 million bioactivity test results from 1.25 million biological assays, covering >10,000 target protein sequences.

As of 2020, with data integration from over 100 new sources, PubChem contains more than 293 million depositor-provided substance descriptions, 111 million unique chemical structures, and 271 million bioactivity data points from 1.2 million biological assays experiments.

== Databases ==
PubChem consists of three dynamically growing primary databases. As of 5 November 2020 (number of BioAssays is unchanged):

- Compounds, 111 million entries (up from 94 million entries in 2017), contains pure and characterized chemical compounds.
- Substances, 293 million entries (up from 236 million entries in 2017 and 163 million in Sept. 2014), contains also mixtures, extracts, complexes and uncharacterized substances.
- BioAssay, bioactivity results from 1.25 million (up from 6,000 in Sept. 2014) high-throughput screening programs with several million values.

== Searching ==
Searching the databases is possible for a broad range of properties including chemical structure, name fragments, chemical formula, molecular weight, XLogP, and hydrogen bond donor and acceptor count.

PubChem contains its own online molecule editor with SMILES/SMARTS and InChI support that allows the import and export of all common chemical file formats to search for structures and fragments.

Each hit provides information about synonyms, chemical properties, chemical structure including SMILES and InChI strings, bioactivity, and links to structurally related compounds and other NCBI databases like PubMed.

In the text search form the database fields can be searched by adding the field name in square brackets to the search term. A numeric range is represented by two numbers separated by a colon. The search terms and field names are case-insensitive. Parentheses and the logical operators AND, OR, and NOT can be used. AND is assumed if no operator is used.

Example (Lipinski's Rule of Five):

0:500[mw] 0:5[hbdc] 0:10[hbac] -5:5[logp]

== Database fields ==
Identification numbers
•	Identification number in current database	[UID]
•	Substance identification number	[SID]
•	Compound identification number	[CID]
•	BioAssay identification number	[BAID], [AID]
General
•	Any database field	[ALL]
•	Comment	[CMT]
•	Deposition date	[DDAT], [DEPDAT]
•	Depositor's external ID	[SRID], [SRCID]
•	Source name	[SRC], [SRCNAM], [SRCNAME]
•	Source release date	[SRD], [SRDAT], [RLSDAT]
•	Medical Subject Heading (MeSH) term	[MSHT], [MESHT]
•	MeSH tree node	[MSHN], [MESHTN]
•	MeSH pharmacological actions	[PHMA], [PHARMA]
Substance properties
•	Substance synonyms	[SYNO]
•	IUPAC name	[UPAC], [IUPAC]
•	International Chemical Identifier (InChI)	[INCHI]
•	Molecular weight	[MW], [MWT], [MOLWT]
•	Chemical elements	[ELMT], [EL]
•	Non-Hydrogen atoms	[HAC], [HACNT]
•	Isotope count	[IAC], [IACNT]
•	Total formal charge	[TFC], [CHG], [CHRG]
•	Chiral atom count	[ACC], [ACCNT]
•	Defined chiral atom count	[ACDC], [ACDCNT]
•	Undefined chiral atom count	[ACUC], [ACUCNT]
•	Hydrogen bond acceptor count	[HBAC], [HBACNT]
•	Hydrogen bond donor count	[HBDC], [HBDCNT]
•	Tautomer count	[TC], [TCNT], [TTMC]
•	Rotatable bond count	[RBC], [RBCNT]
•	XLogP	[XLGP], [LOGP]
Compound properties
•	Compound synonyms	[CSYN], [CSYNO]
•	Component count	[CC], [CCNT]
•	Covalent unit (molecule) count	[CUC], [CUCNT]
•	Total bioactivity count	[TAC]

== See also ==
- Chemical database
  - CAS Common Chemistry - run by the American Chemical Society
  - Comparative Toxicogenomics Database - run by North Carolina State University
  - ChEMBL - run by European Bioinformatics Institute
  - ChemSpider - run by UK's Royal Society of Chemistry
  - DrugBank - run by the University of Alberta
  - IUPAC - run by Swiss-based International Union of Pure and Applied Chemistry (IUPAC)
  - Moltable - run by India's National Chemical Laboratory
  - PubChem - run by the National Institute of Health, USA
  - BindingDB - run by the University of California, San Diego
  - SCRIPDB - run by the University of Toronto, Canada
  - National Center for Biotechnology Information (NCBI) - run by the National Institute of Health, USA
  - Entrez - run by the National Institute of Health, USA
  - GenBank - run by the National Institute of Health, USA
