= CTAB =

CTAB may refer to:

- Cetyl trimethylammonium bromide, an antiseptic agent also used in DNA extraction
- Chemical table file, a data file type used in chemoinformatics
- Canadian Technology Accreditation Board, an accreditation board for post-secondary technology programs in Canada
- "Lungs Clear To Auscultation Bilaterally", an abbreviation used in medical records for lung examination
