= ChemDraw =

Software for drawing chemical structures

- Developer: Revvity Signals
- Operating system: macOS, Microsoft Windows
- Type: Scientific
- License: Proprietary
- Website: ChemDraw on Revvity Signals website

ChemDraw™ is a molecule editor and communication suite, for the management, reporting, and presentation of chemistry research and discoveries.

ChemDraw was originally conceived in 1985 by Selena "Sally" Evans, her husband David A. Evans, and Stewart Rubenstein. In July 1985, ChemDraw was demonstrated at the Gordon Research Conference on Reactions & Processes in New Hampshire, USA, an event remembered by many chemists, such was the breakthrough provided by the software.

Later that same year, Stewart’s younger brother, Michael, began developing Chem3D, a companion program to ChemDraw that allows users to draw three-dimensional chemical structures. ChemDraw’s popularity led to the launch of cheminformatics company Cambridge Scientific Computing, later renamed CambridgeSoft, to further develop the program. CambridgeSoft was sold to PerkinElmer in 2011. In 2022, PerkinElmer split their businesses, and the Life Science and Diagnostics divisions became Revvity, Inc. Today, ChemDraw is developed by Revvity Signals Software, the informatics division of Revvity.

ChemDraw is augmented by a number of desktop applications such as Chem3D (3D modelling) ChemFinder (dataset analysis), and ChemDraw for Excel. In 2024, ChemDraw+, a web-based application, was launched as part of the new product Signals ChemDraw, with full integration with other Revvity Signals solutions.

== Features of ChemDraw ==
ChemDraw is available in three different offerings: ChemDraw Prime, which contains the core functionalities, ChemDraw Professional, and Signals™ ChemDraw:

ChemDraw Prime

- Desktop application
- Efficient chemical drawing with hot-keys and shortcuts
- Structure and reaction clean-up
- Apply styling according to publisher policies
- Property predictions (pKa, logP, logS, etc)

ChemDraw Professional

- Desktop application
- Name-to-structure and structure-to-name conversion
- Structure highlighting for atoms, bonds, and rings
- ^{1}H and ^{13}C NMR spectrum prediction
- Representation of peptides and oligonucleotides following the HELM standard
- Integration with ChemACX, CAS SciFinder®, Elsevier Reaxys®, Google scholar/patents, and other scientific data sources

Signals ChemDraw

- SaaS (Software as a Service) application available from a secured cloud-based environment
- Management and sharing of collections of chemical drawings
- Capability to find and reuse chemical drawings hidden in work documents
- On-line management of licenses and user access rights
- Automatic deployment of latest release

In addition to the desktop version of ChemDraw, there is a web-based version and library known as ChemDraw JS (formerly ChemDraw Direct). The web-based app was previously freely available as late as 2022, whereas use as a library has required special licensing.

== File format ==
The native file formats for ChemDraw are the binary CDX and the preferred XML-based CDXML formats. ChemDraw can also import from, and export to, MOL, SDF, and SKC chemical file formats. Images can be exported to GIF, JPEG, PNG, TIFF, and SVG. 3D printing of molecules can also be performed with the 3MF format.

== See also ==
- Molecule editor
