= XYZ file format =

Chemical file format

XYZ format (chemical)
- Filename extension: .xyz
- Internet media type: chemical/x-xyz
- Type of format: chemical file format

The XYZ file format is a chemical file format. There is no formal standard and several variations exist, but a typical XYZ format specifies the molecule geometry by giving the number of atoms with Cartesian coordinates that will be read on the first line, a comment on the second, and the lines of atomic coordinates in the following lines. The file format is used in computational chemistry programs for importing and exporting geometries. The units are generally in ångströms. Some variations include using atomic numbers instead of atomic symbols, or skipping the comment line. Files using the XYZ format conventionally have the .xyz extension.

== Format ==
The formatting of the .xyz file format is as follows:

<number of atoms>
comment line
<element> <X> <Y> <Z>
...

Connectivity information in the XYZ file format is implied rather than explicit. According to the main page for XYZ (part of XMol),

Note that the XYZ format doesn't contain connectivity information. This intentional omission allows for greater flexibility: to create an XYZ file, you don't need to know where a molecule's bonds are; you just need to know where its atoms are. Connectivity information is generated automatically for XYZ files as they are read into XMol-related applications. Briefly, if the distance between two atoms is less than the sum of their covalent radii, they are considered bonded.

=== Example ===
The pyridine molecule can be described in the XYZ format by the following:

11

C       -0.180226841      0.360945118     -1.120304970
C       -0.180226841      1.559292118     -0.407860970
C       -0.180226841      1.503191118      0.986935030
N       -0.180226841      0.360945118      1.29018350
C       -0.180226841     -0.781300882      0.986935030
C       -0.180226841     -0.837401882     -0.407860970
H       -0.180226841      0.360945118     -2.206546970
H       -0.180226841      2.517950118     -0.917077970
H       -0.180226841      2.421289118      1.572099030
H       -0.180226841     -1.699398882      1.572099030
H       -0.180226841     -1.796059882     -0.917077970

== Animation ==
Most molecule viewers such as Jmol and VMD can show animations using .xyz files. The following is an example xyz format for m successive snapshot which can be rendered as an animation:

<number of atoms>
comment line
atom_symbol11 x-coord11 y-coord11 z-coord11
atom_symbol12 x-coord12 y-coord12 z-coord12
...
atom_symbol1n x-coord1n y-coord1n z-coord1n
<number of atoms>
comment line
atom_symbol21 x-coord21 y-coord21 z-coord21
atom_symbol22 x-coord22 y-coord22 z-coord22
...
atom_symbol2n x-coord2n y-coord2n z-coord2n
.
.
.
<number of atoms>
comment line
atom_symbolm1 x-coordm1 y-coordm1 z-coordm1
atom_symbolm2 x-coordm2 y-coordm2 z-coordm2
...
atom_symbolmn x-coordmn y-coordmn z-coordmn

Note that the xyz standard does not require that the number or chemical nature of atoms should be the same at subsequent snapshots, which allows for atoms disappearing from or coming into the field of view during the animation.
