= JDX =

JDX may stand for:

- JDX Racing, founded by Jeremy Dale (racing driver)
- KJDX, a California radio station branded JDX
- Jamaica Debt Exchange (JDX)
- Judgment debtor exams (JDX)
- JDX, a legal abbreviation for jurisdiction
- .jdx, filename extension for JCAMP-DX
- Hexanitrostilbene (JD-X), an explosive
- Shenyang J-50, also known as the J-DX, a Chinese 6th generation jet stealth fighter
