= JME =

JME or Jme may refer to:

== People ==
- Jme (born 1985), English grime MC and record producer
- J-Me (born 1985), Burmese rapper

== Technology ==
- JME Molecule Editor, a Molecule Editor applet
- jMonkeyEngine, a Java scenegraph API

== Other uses ==
- Juvenile myoclonic epilepsy, a neurological disease
- Jme, a North American streaming service and successor to TV Japan
