= SLN =

SLN may refer to:

- SLN (gene), known as Sarcolipin
- Dutch Sign Language
- Société Le Nickel, a French mining company
- Solid lipid nanoparticle
- Sri Lanka Navy
- Salina Municipal Airport, Kansas, US, IATA code
- SYBYL Line Notation for chemical structures
- Extension for an Asterisk audio file format
