= ACD/ChemSketch =

Molecular modeling program

- Developer: ACD/Labs
- Operating system: Microsoft Windows
- Type: Scientific
- License: Proprietary
- Website: ChemSketch on ACD/Labs site (Commercial version) ChemSketch on ACD/Labs site (Freeware version)

Model of acetylsalicylic acid (aspirin) created using ACD/ChemSketch.

ACD/ChemSketch is a molecular modeling program used to create and modify images of chemical structures. The software allows for the importation and display of molecules and molecular models displayed in two and three dimensions.

== Features ==
ACD/ChemSketch allows for both basic structure drawing and importation of 3D and 2D .MDL files from other molecular modelling programs. ChemSketch has been favorably compared to other molecular modelling software, especially ChemDraw, based on its ability to display a wide range of structural components and the ease of creating complex structures quickly.

The program offers some advanced features that allows the molecules rotate and apply color to improve visualization. It has several templates with ions and functional groups with the possibility to add text and use other tools to optimize productions created by the software.

== Applications ==
Using ACD/ChemSketch is primarily for educational use. With this program it is possible to write and perform chemical equations, diagrams laboratories and chemical structures of various entity.

== See also ==
- Software design
- 3D graphics software
- Molecule editor
