= ChemWindow =

Chemical structure drawing and publishing program

- Developer: Wiley
- Stable release: 2021 / 2021
- Available in: English, Chinese, Japanese, German, French
- Type: Scientific
- Website: chemwindow.com

ChemWindow is a molecule editor and publishing program now published by John Wiley & Sons as of 2020, and originally developed by Bio-Rad Laboratories, Inc. It was first developed by SoftShell International in the 1990s. Bio-Rad acquired this technology in 1996 and eventually made it part of their KnowItAll software product line, offering a specific ChemWindow edition of their software for structure drawing and publishing. They have also incorporated ChemWindow structure drawing components into their KnowItAll spectroscopy software packages with their DrawIt, ReportIt, and MineIt tools.

== Features ==
- 2D chemical structure drawing (includes stereochemical recognition)
- Scientific publishing / reporting tools
- 3D ViewIt Input and visualization of 3D structures
- Portal with useful links for user community
- 3D presentations and 3D modeling, plus calculation of bond lengths, angles, etc.
- Build databases with structures and chemical property information
- Database searching (search structures and properties)
- Data plotting and visualization
- Laboratory Glassware Collection to document your experiments
- Chemical Engineering Collection for realistic process flow diagrams
- Calculators for easy mole-to-mass conversion and calculation of mass from structure
- Mass Fragmentation Tool
- Multiple interface languages (English, Chinese, Japanese, German, French)
- DEA Controlled Substance Prediction and Structure Classification
