= XDrawChem =

Software for chemical structure drawing

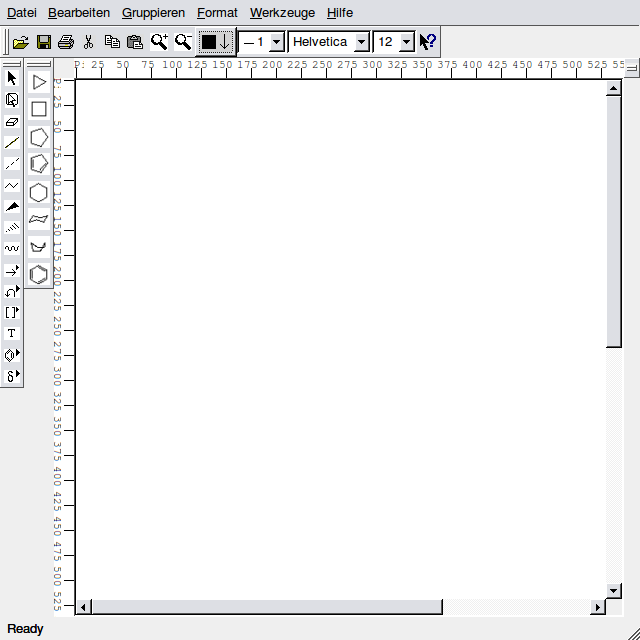
- XDrawChem 1.9.9
- Stable release: 2.0.1 / April 23, 2026; 5 months ago
- Written in: C++
- Operating system: UNIX and X Window (Linux, SGI IRIX, Sun Solaris, others...) or macOS
- Type: Molecular editor
- License: GNU GPL
- Repository: github.com/bryanherger/xdrawchem

XDrawChem is a free software program for drawing chemical structural formulas, available for Unix and macOS. It is distributed under the GNU GPL. In Microsoft Windows this program is called WinDrawChem.

== Major features ==
- Fixed length and fixed angle drawing
- Automatic alignment of figures
- Detection of structures, text, and arrows, and their automatic placement
- Can automatically draw rings and other structures - has all standard amino acids and nucleic acids in a built-in library
- Retrieval of structures from a network database based on CAS number, formula, or name
- Retrieval of information on a molecule based on a drawing
- Symbols such as partial charge and radicals
- Reading MDL Molfiles, CML (Chemical Markup Language), ChemDraw binary format, ChemDraw XML text format
- Writing MDL Molfiles, CML, ChemDraw XML text format
- Integration with OpenBabel, allowing XDrawChem to read and write over 20 different chemical file formats.
- Image export in Portable Network Graphics (PNG), Windows bitmap, Encapsulated PostScript (EPS), and Scalable Vector Graphics (SVG)
- 3D structure generation with the help of the external program BUILD3D
- Simple spectra predictions, including ^{13}C-NMR, ^{1}H-NMR (based on additive rules and functional group lookup methods), and IR
- Simple property estimation, including pK_{a}, octanol-water partition coefficient, and gas-phase enthalpy change.
