= CDX Format =

Chemical structure file format

ChemDraw Drawing
- Filename extension: .cdx
- Internet media type: chemical/x-cdx
- Developed by: CambridgeSoft
- Type of format: Document file format

CDX (ChemDraw Exchange) is a binary file type created by CambridgeSoft Corporation's ChemDraw chemical structure application. CDXML is the XML and preferred version of this format.

CDX is the native file format used by ChemDraw to store molecular data, such as atoms, bonds, fragments, arrows and text in a tagged binary format, accurately. The CDX file format is used across Windows, Mac and Linux distributions.
