= CDXML =

ChemDraw XML Drawing
- Filename extension: .cdxml
- Internet media type: chemical/x-cdxml
- Developed by: CambridgeSoft
- Type of format: Document file format
- Extended from: XML

CDXML is the XML analogue of the binary CDX file type used by CambridgeSoft Corporation's ChemDraw chemical structure application. It is considered to be the preferred format for future development.
