= Joint Committee on Atomic and Molecular Physical Data =

The Joint Committee on Atomic and Molecular Physical Data (JCAMP) defined several JCAMP-DX (JCAMP-data exchange) file formats in chemistry. IUPAC took over the responsibility of maintaining and extending the JCAMP-DX standards from JCAMP in 1995.
