= SCRIPDB =

Content
- Description: syntheses, chemicals and reactions in patents. It is maintained by the University of Toronto. \

Contact
- Research center: University of Toronto
- Laboratory: Department of Computer Science
- Authors: Abraham Heifets
- Primary citation: Heifets & al. (2012)
- Release date: 2011

Access
- Website: http://dcv.uhnres.utoronto.ca/SCRIPDB.

SCRIPDB was a database of chemical structures associated to patents. The database is no longer active or maintained.
