= JCAMP-DX =

File format for spectroscopic data

jcamp
- Filename extension: .jdx, .dx
- Internet media type: chemical/x-jcamp-dx
- Type of format: chemical file format

JCAMP-DX are text-based file formats created by JCAMP for storing spectroscopic data. It started as a file format for Infrared spectroscopy. It was later expanded to cover Nuclear magnetic resonance spectroscopy, mass spectrometry, electron magnetic resonance and circular dichroism spectroscopy. Later extensions for good laboratory practice were added to cover contract laboratories needs. Despite all efforts to create an easy to comprehend standards, most vendor implementations differ slightly. An open source implementation exists in Java.
