= Open Babel =

Chemical informatics software

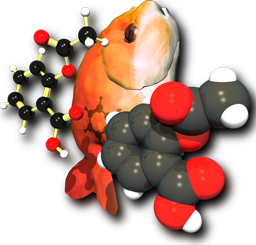
- Developer: Open Babel development team
- Release: 2 June 2005; 21 years ago
- Stable release: 3.2.1 / 11 July 2026; 35 days ago
- Written in: C, C++ (wxWidgets)
- Operating system: Windows, macOS, Linux, Android
- Platform: IA-32, x86-64
- Available in: English
- Type: Cheminformatics, molecular modelling
- License: GPL 2.0
- Website: www.openbabel.org
- Repository: www.github.com/openbabel/openbabel

Open Babel is a free chemical informatics software designed to facilitate the conversion of Chemical file formats and manage molecular data. It serves as a chemical expert system, widely used in fields such as cheminformatics, molecular modelling, and computational chemistry. Open Babel provides both a comprehensive library and command-line utilities, making it a versatile tool for researchers, developers, and professionals.

== About ==
Due to the strong relationship to informatics this program belongs more to the category cheminformatics than to molecular modelling. It is available for Windows, Unix, Linux, macOS, and Android. It is free and open-source software released under a GNU General Public License (GPL) 2.0.

The project's stated goal is: "Open Babel is a community-driven scientific project assisting both users and developers as a cross-platform program and library designed to support molecular modeling, chemistry, and many related areas, including interconversion of file formats and data."

== History ==
Open Babel and JOELib were derived from the OELib cheminformatics library. In turn, OELib was based on ideas in the original chemistry program Babel and an unreleased object-oriented programming library called OBabel.

== Major features ==
- chemical expert system
- interconversion of many chemical file formats
- substructure search, based on simplified molecular-input line-entry system (SMILES)
- fingerprint calculation
- 3D coordinate generation
- wrappers for Python, Perl, Java, Ruby, C#

== Applications ==
In cheminformatics, Open Babel facilitates the management of molecular data through substructure searching and molecular fingerprint calculations. These functionalities enable similarity analysis, dataset clustering, and efficient organization of chemical libraries, making it suitable for large-scale workflows.

In drug discovery, Open Babel supports tasks such as preparing chemical libraries for high-throughput virtual screening and standardizing molecular formats for structure-based drug design. The software's ability to generate 3D molecular coordinates and calculate molecular descriptors is particularly valuable in predicting properties such as solubility, reactivity, and toxicity.

== See also ==
- Avogadro – molecular builder and editor based on Open Babel
- Ghemical – molecular mechanics program based on Open Babel
- JOELib – Java version of Open Babel and OELib
- XDrawChem – 2D drawing program based on Open Babel
- Comparison of software for molecular mechanics modeling
- Blue Obelisk
- List of free and open-source software packages
