= OELib =

OELib was an open source Cheminformatics library written by Matt Stahl and based on the ideas of OBabel. Its actual GPLed C++ and Java based successors are OpenBabel and JOELib, with Its commercial successor being called OEChem.

== See also ==
- JOELib
- OpenBabel
