= Markush structure =

Chemical structure representation

Example of a Markush structure

A Markush structure, Markush group, or a Markush claim is a visual representation used to indicate a group of related chemical compounds. They are commonly used in chemistry texts and in patent claims. Markush structures are depicted with multiple independently variable groups, such as R groups in which a side chain can have varying structure. This more general depiction of the molecule, versus detailing every atom in the molecule, is used to protect intellectual property. The company which applies for a patent makes a general claim for the usage of the molecule without revealing to their competitors the exact molecule for which they are declaring a useful application.

== History ==
Markush structures are named after Eugene A. Markush, founder of the Pharma Chemical Corporation in New Jersey. He was involved in a legal case that set a precedent for generic chemical structure patent filing, Ex parte Markush, 1925 Dec. Comm'r Pat. 126, 127 (1924). The patent filing was US Application 611,637, filed January 9, 1923. Markush was awarded a patent from the US Patent Office for “Pyrazolone Dye and Process of Making the Same” on August 26, 1924.

== Use in patents ==
In describing a chemical, a Markush structure allows the patent-holder to list several active/effective structural formulas.

=== United States ===
In the United States, Markush structures are frequently used to claim alternative components. The correct format for a Markush structure is "closed." In other words, the claim language defined by the Markush structure requires selection from a closed group. One way of claiming a Markush structure follows the format: “a chemical selected from the group consisting of A, B, and C” where A, B, and C are alternative chemicals.

A claimed Markush structure may be improper if (1) the members of the Markush structure do not share a "single structural similarity," or (2) if the members of the Markush structure do not share a common use.

== See also ==
- Molecule editor
- Chemical file format
- List of patent claim types § Markush
