= Molecule editor =

Program for simulating chemical structures

A molecule editor is a computer program for creating and modifying representations of chemical structures.

Molecule editors can manipulate chemical structure representations in either a simulated two-dimensional space or three-dimensional space, via 2D computer graphics or 3D computer graphics, respectively. Two-dimensional output is used as illustrations or to query chemical databases. Three-dimensional output is used to build molecular models, usually as part of molecular modelling software packages.

Database molecular editors such as Leatherface, RECAP, and Molecule Slicer allow large numbers of molecules to be modified automatically according to rules such as 'deprotonate carboxylic acids' or 'break exocyclic bonds' that can be specified by a user.

Molecule editors typically support reading and writing at least one file format or line notation. Examples of each include Molfile and simplified molecular input line entry specification (SMILES), respectively.

Files generated by molecule editors can be displayed by molecular graphics tools.

== Standalone programs ==
=== 2D structure editing ===
Program	Developer(s)	License	Platforms	Info
ACD/ChemSketch	ACD/Labs	Proprietary	Windows	A chemically intelligent drawing interface allowing creation of 2D structures for organics, organometallics, polymers, and Markush structures. Freeware version available.
BIOVIA Draw	Dassault Systèmes	Proprietary	Windows	Successor of ISIS/Draw.
ChemDraw	Revvity Signals	Proprietary	Windows, macOS	Primarily for editing 2D chemical structures and reactions
ChemWindow	Wiley	Proprietary	Windows	Freeware for academic research and teaching; part of the KnowItAll software environment
JChemPaint	JChemPaint Developers	GNU LGPL	Cross-platform	A 2D structural formula editor written in Java
XDrawChem	XDrawChem developers	GNU GPL	Windows, macOS, Linux	A 2D chemical structure drawing tool based on OpenBabel

=== 3D structure editing ===
Program	Developer(s)	License	Platforms	Info	Last Release
Amira (software)	Visage Imaging; Zuse Institute Berlin	Proprietary	Windows, macOS, Linux	Includes 3D visualization tools. Trial version available.	
Ascalaph Designer	Agile Molecule	GNU GPL	Windows, Linux	A freeware 3D molecule editor.	2009
Avogadro	Avogadro project team	GNU GPL	Windows, macOS, Linux	A 3D molecule editor and visualizer.	23 October 2026
Deneb	AtelGraphics	Proprietary	Windows, Linux	GUI for simulation packages, including 3D editing.	
ECCE	Pacific Northwest National Laboratory (to 2013); FriendsofECCE	Educational Community License 2.0	Linux; macOS and Windows (preview)	A 3D molecule builder with a structure library, symmetry tools and periodic cells, part of an environment for setting up, running and analysing quantum chemistry and molecular dynamics calculations.	2026
Gabedit	Abdulrahman Allouche	BSD	Windows, macOS, Linux	A 3D molecule editor with visualization capabilities.	27 July 2021
MOE	Chemical Computing Group	Proprietary	Windows, macOS, Linux	Includes 3D molecular sketching, editing, and 2D to 3D conversion.	June 2024
PyMOL	Schrödinger, Inc.	Proprietary (Open-source version available)	Cross-platform	Popular molecular visualization tool with basic 3D editing capabilities for structural analysis.	1 February 2025
SAMSON	OneAngstrom	Proprietary	Windows, macOS, Linux	A modular platform for computational nanoscience, including 3D molecular editing.	2025
Spartan	Wavefunction, Inc.	Proprietary	Windows, macOS, Linux	Focused on 3D molecular modeling and simulation.	
VMD	University of Illinois	Free for non-commercial use	Cross-platform	3D Molecular visualization tool that includes structure editing through the Molefacture plugin.	30 November 2016
YASARA	YASARA Biosciences	Proprietary (Free version available)	Cross-platform	Molecular graphics and modeling software focused on structural biology, with extensive 3D capabilities.	5 October 2024

== Java Applets ==
Applet	Developer(s)	License	Info
JChemPaint		GNU LGPL	Editor and viewer applets
JME Molecule Editor	Peter Ertl	Proprietary	freeware available from Molinspiration; Freeware for noncommercial use

== JavaScript embeddable editors ==
Program	Developer	License	Desktop Browser IE6-7-8	Desktop Browser other	iPad	iPhone	Android	Info
Kekulé Program	Kekule.js Lab	MIT License	Yes	Yes	Unknown	Unknown	Unknown	

== See also ==
- ChemSpider
- Comparison of software for molecular mechanics modeling
- Molecular design software
