= List of omics topics in biology =

Inspired by the terms genome and genomics, other words to describe complete biological datasets, mostly sets of biomolecules originating from one organism, have been coined with the suffix -ome and -omics. Some of these terms are related to each other in a hierarchical fashion. For example, the genome contains the ORFeome, which gives rise to the transcriptome, which is translated to the proteome. Other terms are overlapping and refer to the structure and/or function of a subset of proteins (e.g. glycome, kinome).

An omicist is a scientist who studies omeomics, cataloging all the "omics" subfields.

Omics.org is a Wiki that collects and alphabetically lists all the known "omes" and "omics."

== List of topics ==
-ome	Field of study (-omics)	Collection of	Parent subject	Notes
Acetylome	Acetylomics	complete set of proteins and their corresponding lysine residues that undergo acetylation	Molecular Biology	
Allergenome	Allergenomics	Proteomics of allergens	Genetics	
Antibodyome	Antibodyomics	The complete set of antibodies present in an organism	Immunology	
Archaeome	Archaeomics	The collective genetic material of microorganisms in archaeological samples	Microbiology	
Bacteriome	Bacteriomics	Community of bacteria associated with a particular ecological niche or host organism	Microbiology	
Bibliome	Bibliomics	Scientific bibliographic data		
Biointeractome	Biointeractomics	The complete set of molecular interactions within a biological system	Molecular Biology	
Biome		The whole set of ecological community of organisms and environments	Ecology	
Cellome	Cellomics		Cellular Biology	
Connectome	Connectomics	Structural and functional brain connectivity at different spatiotemporal scales	Neuroscience	
Cytome	Cytomics	Cellular systems of an organism	Cytology	
Editome		RNA editing sites		
Embryome	Embryomics	Cell lineages of embryonic cells, genes expressed and antigens present during development	Embryology	
Envirome	Enviromics	Gene related environment factors (envirome)		
Environmental DNA	Environmental omics	Sequencing of ambient DNA		
Epigenome	Epigenomics	Epigenetic modifications	Molecular genetics	Epigenomics is the study of the complete set of epigenetic modifications on the genetic material of a cell, collectively known as the epigenome
Exposome (2005)	Exposomics	An individual's environmental exposures, including in the prenatal environment	Molecular genetics	A proposed term and field of study of the disease-causing effects of environmental factors (the "nurture" component of "nature vs. nurture").
Exposome (2009)		Composite occupational exposures and occupational health problems	Occupational safety and health	The proposers of this term were aware of the previous term as used above but proposed to apply the term to a new field.
Exome	Exomics	Exons in a genome	Molecular Genetics	
Foodome	Foodomics	Food and Nutrition issues related to bioactivity, quality, safety and traceability of foods through the application and integration of advanced omics technologies to improve consumer's well-being, health, and confidence.	Nutrition	The term was first defined in 2009
	Functional genomics	gene (and protein) functions and interactions	Molecular Biology	
Genome	Genomics (Classical genetics)	Genes (DNA sequences/Chromosomes)	Genetics	"Genome" refers to the set of all genes in an organism. However, "genome" was coined decades before it was discovered that most DNA is "non-coding" and not part of a gene; thus, "genome" originally referred to the entire collection of DNA within an organism. Today, both definitions are used, depending on the context.
Glycome	Glycomics	Glycans	Glycobiology	
Hologenome	Hologenomics	Genomes of community members (i.e., holobionts)	Metagenomics	
Humeome	Humeomics	The chemical components of soil humus	Soil science	
Interferome	Interferomics	Interferons	Immunology	Also a database of the same name.
Interactome	Interactomics	All interactions		The term "interactomics" is generally not used. Instead, interactomes are considered the study of systems biology.
Ionome	Ionomics	Inorganic biomolecules	Molecular Biology	
Kinome	Kinomics	Kinases	Molecular Biology	Proteins that add a phosphate group
Lipidome	Lipidomics	Lipids	Biochemistry	
Mechanome	Mechanomics	The mechanical systems within an organism		
Metabolome	Metabolomics	Metabolites		All products of a biological reaction (including intermediates)
Metagenome	Metagenomics	Genetic material found in an environmental sample	Molecular Biology	The genetic material is assumed to contain DNA from multiple organisms and therefore multiple genomes, hence the inclusion of the prefix meta-.
Metallome	Metallomics	Metals and metalloids		
Microbiome	microbiomics	Collection of microorganisms in another organism such as an animal	Microbiology	
Obesidome	Obesidomics	Obesity related proteins	Proteomics	Coined by Pardo et al., 2012.
ORFeome	ORFeomics	Open reading frames (ORFs)	Molecular Genetics	
Organome	Organomics	Organ interactions	Cellular Signalling / Cell Signaling and Tissue Engineering	The study of crosstalk between organs using physiologically relevant in-vitro models
Parvome	Parvomics	Secondary metabolites	Biochemistry	Coined by Mark Martin and introduced by Julian Davies in 2008, referring to the Latin parvus for "small", and describing the "humungous microbial world of small (secreted) molecules of great structural diversity". See also
Pharmacogenetics	Pharmacogenetics	SNPs and their effect on pharmacokinetics and pharmacodynamics	Pharmacogenomics; Genomics	
Pharmacogenome	Pharmacogenomics	The effect of changes on the genome on pharmacology	Pharmacogenetics; Genomics	
Phenome	Phenomics	Phenotypes	Genetics	
Physiome	Physiomics	Physiology of an organism		
Phytochemome	Phytochemomics	Phytochemicals		The term has been coined by del Castillo et al., 2013, Food Research International. Phytochemomics is a comprehensive concept aimed to increase the knowledge of phytochemicals' bioactivity which is of growing importance in agricultural, food, medicine and cosmetic sciences
Proteome	Proteomics	Proteins	Molecular Biology	
Regulome	Regulomics	Transcription factors and other molecules involved in the regulation of gene expression	Molecular Biology	
Researchsome		Research areas covered by an individual researcher or institution	Research	Coined by Ivan Erill at the 2011 EBM meeting
Secretome	Secretomics	Secreted proteins	Proteomics	Subset of the proteome consisting of proteins actively exported from cells.
Speechome	Speecheomics	Influences on language acquisition		Coined by the Human Speechome Project
Synthetome		A set of artificial genes in an organism		
Transcriptome	Transcriptomics	All RNA molecules including mRNA, rRNA, tRNA and other ncRNAs	Molecular Biology	
Trialome	Medicine	Human interventional trials data from clinical trial registries extended with trial results and links to resulting publications		
Toponome	Toponomics	Cell and tissue structure	Molecular Biology	
Virome	Viromics	complete set of viruses	Virology	
Volatilome	Volatilomics	complete collection of volatile metabolites	Biomarkers	

== Hierarchy of topics ==
For the sake of clarity, some topics are listed more than once.

Of biomolecules (moleculome):

- Antibodyome
- Epigenome
  - Methylome
- Genome
  - Variome
  - Exome
  - ORFeome
  - Transcriptome
    - Editome
  - Pharmacogenome
  - Regulome
  - Hologenome
  - Metagenome
  - Interferome (interferon-regulated genes)
- Membranome
- Metallome
- Glycome
- Ionome
- Lipidome
- Metabolome
  - Volatilome
- Metallome
- Proteome
  - Acetylome – post-transcriptional modification
  - Kinome
  - Secretome
  - Chaperome
  - Allergenome

Of molecule-molecule interactions:

- Interactome (between large molecules)
- Fluxome (between large molecules and their [mainly small] substrates)

Of parts of an organism, or characteristics of it:

- Cytome
- Embryome
- Obesidome
- Organome
- Phenome
- Physiome
  - Connectome
    - Synaptome
  - Dynome
  - Mechanome
- Regulome
- Toponome

Of the broader environment (Exposome):

- Envirome
  - Toxome
- Foodome
- Biome - Microbiome
- Sociome

Of man-made objects:

- Bibliome
- Researchsome
- Trialome
