= Mary Lou Guerinot =

American biologist

- Education: Cornell University, Dalhousie University
- Known for: Research of metal metabolism in plants. Discovery of the proteins IRT1 and VIT1, which are responsible for the uptake of metal ions from soil in plants. Helped develop the field of ionomics.
- Scientific career
- Fields: molecular genetics
- Workplaces: Dartmouth College
- Thesis: The association of N₂-fixing bacteria with sea urchins (1979)
- Doctoral advisor: David G. Patriquin

Mary Lou Guerinot is an American molecular geneticist who works as Ronald and Deborah Harris Professor in the Sciences at Dartmouth College. Her research concerns the cellular uptake and regulation of metal ions.

== Biography ==
Guerinot was born and grew up in Rochester, New York. She graduated from Cornell University in 1975, and earned her Ph.D. in marine biology in 1979 from Dalhousie University under the supervision of David G. Patriquin. Her doctoral studies focused on the sea urchin-lobster-kelp ecosystem.

After postdoctoral research at the University of Maryland and Michigan State University, she joined the Dartmouth faculty in 1985. In 1994, Guerinot became the first women to chair a science department at Dartmouth when she was appointed the chair Department of Biological Sciences. She became the Ronald and Deborah Harris Professor in the Sciences in 2005. In 2022, Guerinot joined the Salk Institute as Nonresident Fellow.

She became a fellow of the American Association for the Advancement of Science in 2007, and of the American Society of Plant Biologists in 2009. In 2016, Guerinot was elected to the National Academy of Sciences and has been serving a three-year term on the academy's leadership council since 2023.

== Scientific contributions ==
Mary Lou Guerinot applies her research to solve problems in agriculture and human health, such as the need for fortified food crops and sustainable plant-based solutions for removing toxic metals from soil.

She helped discover the protein IRT1, a high-affinity ion transporter that is responsible for the uptake of heavy metals from soil in plants. Guerinot was among the first plant biologists to use synchrotron X-ray fluorescence microprobe imaging to study the distribution of trace elements in plants, with which she identified VIT1, an ion transporter that brings iron into a developing plant seed. Guerinot and her team used this technique to discover where iron is localized in seeds.

Guerinot helped develop the field of ionomics.

== Awards and honors ==
- 2009 - Faculty Mentoring Award, designed by the Graduate Student Council (GSC) in the Guarini School of Graduate and Advanced Studies at Dartmouth College to recognize outstanding commitment to fostering the professional and personal development of graduate students.
- 2012 - Dennis R. Hoagland Award, a triennial monetary award given by the American Society of Plant Biologists (ASPB) to a scientist member of the ASPB who has made significant contributions to plant research in support of agriculture.
- 2015 - Dean of the Faculty Award for Outstanding Mentoring and Advising, one of the honors given out annually by the Office of the Dean of Faculty of Arts and Sciences at Dartmouth College to recognize faculty members for exceptional teaching, scholarship, and service.
- 2018 - Stephen Hales Prize, an annual monetary award given by the American Society of Plant Biologists (ASPB) to a scientist member of the ASPB who has made significant contributions to plant biology.
