= Speechome =

Speechome in linguistics is different from other common biological -omes such as genome, proteome, and expressome in that it is not biological. However, speechome reflects the omics trend in biology and science in general.

The totality of human speech components such as phoneme which is the smallest contrastive unit in the sound system of a language.

Academic researchers in speech and hearing science and machine-produced speech from Massachusetts, according to a CNN news story from March 2011, used complex recording devices and microphones to record every aspect of the evolution of their son's speech over the time span of three years; with the use of complex algorithms this enabled them to trace the development and context of individual words and phrases across that time.

== See also ==
- Human Speechome Project
