= Membranome =

Set of biological membranes

Membranome is the set of biological membranes existing in a specific organism. The term was proposed by British biologist Thomas Cavalier-Smith to discuss epigenetics of biological membranes. The term was also used to define the entire set of membrane proteins in an organism or a combination of membrane proteome and lipidome.

== See also ==
- Membranome database
