= The Genomic HyperBrowser =

The Genomic HyperBrowser is a web-based system for statistical analysis of genomic annotation data.

== History ==
The Genomic HyperBrowser has been developed since early 2008 and went public in December 2010. The latest version of the system (v1.6) was released in May 2013. The system is developed by the Norwegian Bioinformatics Platform, a joint project between the University of Bergen, the University of Oslo, the Norwegian University of Science and Technology, the University of Tromsø and the Norwegian University of Life Sciences. The Genomic HyperBrowser is free software under the GNU GPL v3.

== Use ==
The HyperBrowser allows a range of genomic investigations (for example, including regulation of gene expression, disease association or epigenetic modifications of the genome). The primary focus of the system is on statistical inference on relations between genomic tracks, though simpler descriptive statistics and analysis of individual tracks is also supported. An example of analysis is to investigate the relationship between histone modifications and gene expression, using ChIP-based tracks of histone modifications versus tracks of genes marked with expression values from a microarray experiment. The web server includes a sizable collection of annotation tracks, and also supports user-uploaded tracks. The Genomic HyperBrowser runs as a stand-alone system, but is tightly integrated with the Galaxy scientific workflow platform for handling of genomic data, especially at the user interface side.

A project to compile a differential disease regulome used the Genomic HyperBrowser in mapping transcription factors against all human diseases.

== See also ==
- UCSC Genome Browser
- Galaxy
