= Regulome =

Regulatory components of a living cell

Regulome refers to the whole set of regulatory components in a cell. Those components can be regulatory elements, genes, mRNAs, proteins, and metabolites. The description includes the interplay of regulatory effects between these components, and their dependence on variables such as subcellular localization, tissue, developmental stage, and pathological state.

== Components ==
One of the major players in cellular regulation are transcription factors, proteins that regulate the expression of genes. Other proteins that bind to transcription factors to form transcriptional complexes might modify the activity of transcription factors, for example blocking their capacity to bind to a promoter.

Signaling pathways are groups of proteins that produce an effect in a chain that transmit a signal from one part of the cell to another part, for example, linking the presence of substance at the exterior of the cell to the activation of the expression of a gene.

== Measuring ==
High-throughput technologies for the analysis of biological samples (for example, DNA microarrays, proteomics analysis) allow the measurement of thousands of biological components such as mRNAs, proteins, or metabolites. Chromatin immunoprecipitation of transcription factors can be used to map transcription factor binding sites in the genome.

Such techniques allow researchers to study the effects of particular substances and/or situations on a cellular sample at a genomic level (for example, by addition of a drug, or by placing cells in a situation of stress). The information obtained allows parts of the regulome to be inferred.

== Modeling ==
One of the objectives of systems biology is the modeling of biological processes using mathematics and computer simulation. The production of data from techniques of genomic analysis is not always amenable to interpretation mainly due to the complexity of the data and the large number of data points. Modeling can handle the data and allow to test a hypothesis (for example, gene A is regulated by protein B) that can be verified experimentally.

== Applications ==
The complete knowledge of the regulome will allow researchers to model cell behaviour entirely. This will facilitate the design of drugs for therapy, the control of stem cell differentiation, and the prognosis of disease.

== See also ==
- Genome
- Proteome
- Cytome
- Bioinformatics
- Systems biology
- DNA microarray
- Mass spectrometry
- 2-D electrophoresis
- Protein engineering
- Swiss-Prot
- List of omics topics in biology
