= BioPlex =

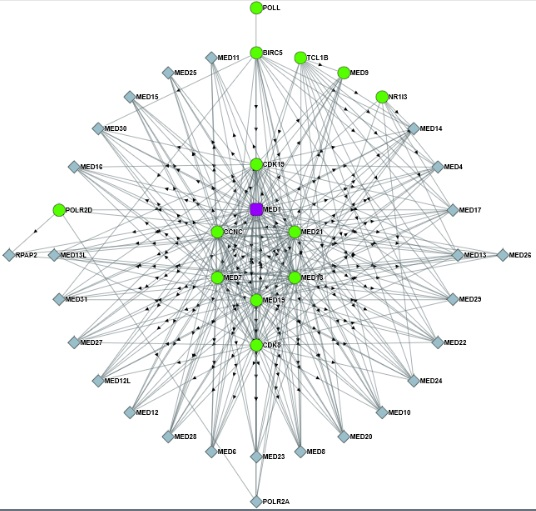
The interaction network of MED1, one of the subunit of the Mediator complex.

BioPlex (biophysical interactions of ORFeome-based complexes) is an open access resource for studying protein-protein interactions. It is the result of collaborations between Harvard Medical School and Biogen. BioPlex 1.0 reported 23,744 interactions among 7,668 proteins. BioPlex 2.0 extended those observations to detect over 29,000 new interactions.

The basic technology is to express a "bait" protein in human cells. Those bait proteins interact with other proteins, and then the complexes of the bait and "prey" proteins are isolated by affinity purification. The interacting prey proteins are identified using mass spectrometry.

== Use in research ==
Determining the interaction partners of poorly characterized proteins can provide clues to the function of those proteins, and knowing which "protein community" a disease gene resides in can give better context for its action.

== See also ==
- Human proteome project
- Interactome
- Proteome
