= Sociome =

The Sociome is a concept used by scientists in Biology and Sociology referring to the dimensions of existence that are social. The term is also an indication of the convergence of systems biology and the study of society as a complex system that has begun to occur among early 21st Century scientists. Just as the phenome is typically thought of as the set of expressed phenotypes of an organism, the sociome can be thought of as the set of observed characteristics of societies. For example, while all societies consisting of humans might be thought of as having the potential to become egalitarian social democracies, not all observed societies are egalitarian or social democracies. Thus, the sociome can also be thought of indirectly as an ideal type of the unrealized potential of any given organization of social beings.

== Origin of term ==
The first known usage of the term sociome was in 2001 by Daichi Kamiyama. The term has also been utilized by sociologist Adam Thomas Perzynski. The two scientists differ in their usage. Kamiyama's study describes a new scientific "era of the sociome (Sociology[+ome])" characterized by the study of the social activities of molecules. This usage is an anthropomorphism of social behavior, wherein molecules are described as having the ability to socialize. Perzynski's social scientific usage varies from this considerably. While Sociology is the study of society, behavior and social relationships, the sociome is the characterization and quantification of patterns, variables, activities, relationships and attributes across all societies that exist and can be studied. The suffix -ome has been used primarily in biology, as in genome, proteome, microbiome, metabolome and phenome. Basu and colleagues have used the term sociome to refer to a sort of standardized approach to the characterization of geocoded social attributes (e.g. neighborhood level). In 2014, Del Savio and colleagues discussed the blurring of the boundaries between disciplines, and increased enthusiasm for the sociome concept and its importance for research in social science, epigenetics and epidemiology, with cautionary advice about the risks rooted in the marred history of Sociobiology

Still other authors have referred to sociomics as the bidirectional interplay between the field of Science and Technology Studies and all other "-omics" fields.

The -omics Wikipedia entry had previously listed sociome as a proposed new name for sociology, although it is unclear whether this has ever actually been proposed by any credible source. Still others have proposed that sociome is the object of study of Sociometry.
