= Toponomics =

Study of protein networks in biology

Toponomics is a discipline in systems biology, molecular cell biology, and histology concerning the study of the toponome of organisms. It is the field of study that proposes to decode the complete toponome in health and disease (the human toponome project)—which is the next big challenge in human biotechnology after having decoded the human genome.

A toponome is the spatial network code of proteins and other biomolecules in morphologically intact cells and tissues.

The spatial organization of biomolecules in cells is directly revealed by imaging cycler microscopy with parameter- and dimension-unlimited functional resolution. The resulting toponome structures are hierarchically organized and can be described by a three symbol code.

== Etymology ==
The terms toponome and toponomics were introduced in 2003 by Walter Schubert based on observations with imaging cycler microscopes (ICM).

Toponome derived from the ancient Greek nouns topos (τόπος, 'place, position') and 'nomos' (νόμος, 'law'). Hence toponomics is a descriptive term addressing the fact that the spatial network of biomolecules in cells follows topological rules enabling coordinated action.
