= Metallome =

Distribution of metal ions in a cellular compartment

In biochemistry, the metallome is the distribution of metal ions in a cellular compartment. The term was coined in analogy with proteome, as metallomics is the study of metallome: the "comprehensive analysis of the entirety of metal and metalloid species within a cell or tissue type". Therefore, metallomics can be considered a branch of metabolomics, even though the metals are not typically considered as metabolites.

An alternative definition of "metallomes" as metalloproteins or any other metal-containing biomolecules, and "metallomics" is a study of such biomolecules.

== Metallointeractome ==
In the study of metallomes the transcriptome, proteome and the metabolome constitutes the whole metallome. A study of the metallome is done to arrive at the metallointeractome.

== Metallotranscriptome ==
The metallotranscriptome can be defined as the map of the entire transcriptome in the presence of biologically or environmentally relevant concentrations of an essential or toxic metal, respectively. The metallometabolome constitutes the complete pool of small metabolites in a cell at any given time. This gives rise to the whole metallointeractome and knowledge of this is important in comparative metallomics dealing with toxicity and drug discovery.

== See also ==
- Bioinorganic chemistry
- -omics
