= Glycome =

Set of all sugars, free or bound, in an organism

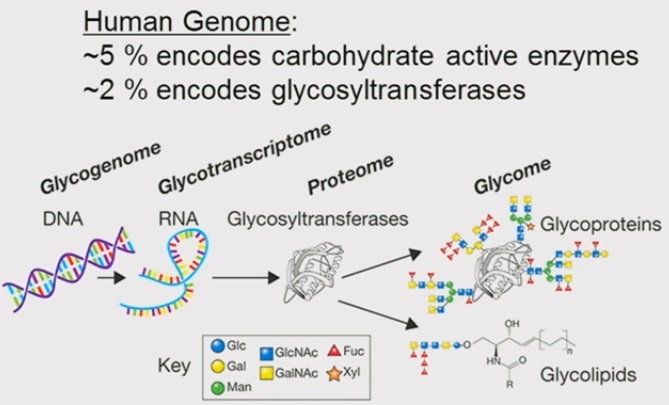
A glycome is composed of glycoproteins and glycolipids.

A glycome is the entire complement or complete set of all sugars, whether free or chemically bound in more complex molecules, of an organism. An alternative definition is the entirety of carbohydrates in a cell. The glycome may in fact be one of the most complex entities in nature. "Glycomics, analogous to genomics and proteomics, is the systematic study of all glycan structures of a given cell type or organism" and is a subset of glycobiology.

"Carbohydrate", "glycan", "saccharide", and "sugar" are generic terms used interchangeably in this context and includes monosaccharides, oligosaccharides, polysaccharides, and derivatives of these compounds. Carbohydrates consist of "hydrated carbon", i.e. [CH_{2}O]n. Monosaccharides are a carbohydrate that cannot be hydrolyzed into a simpler carbohydrate and are the building blocks of oligosaccharides and polysaccharides. Oligosaccharides are linear or branched chains of monosaccharides attached to one another via glycosidic linkages. The number of monosaccharide units can vary. Polysaccharides are glycans composed of repeating monosaccharides, generally greater than ten monosaccharide units in length.

The glycome exceeds the complexity of the proteome as a result of the even greater diversity of the glycome's constituent carbohydrates and is further complicated by the sheer multiplicity of possibilities in the combination and interaction of the carbohydrates with each other and with proteins. "The spectrum of all glycan structures — the glycome — is immense. In humans, its size is orders of magnitude greater than the number of proteins that are encoded by the genome, one percent of which encodes proteins that make, modify, localize or bind sugar chains, which are known as glycans."

The outer surface of the cell is a sea of lipids with a fleet of sugar molecules, many of which are attached to proteins, fats or both, that interact with molecules outside the cell and are critical for the communication between cells and the stickiness of a cell. "Glycans are nature's biologic modifiers," says Jamey Marth, a Howard Hughes Medical Institute investigator at the University of California San Diego."Glycans generally don't turn physiologic processes on and off, rather they modify the behavior of the cell by responding to external stimuli."

== Tools used for research on glycome ==
The following are examples of the commonly used techniques in glycan analysis:

=== High-resolution mass spectrometry (MS) and high-performance liquid chromatography (HPLC) ===
The most commonly applied methods are MS and HPLC, in which the glycan part is cleaved either enzymatically or chemically from the target and subjected to analysis. In case of glycolipids, they can be analyzed directly without separation of the lipid component.

N-glycans from glycoproteins are analyzed routinely by high-performance-liquid-chromatography (reversed phase, normal phase and ion exchange HPLC) after tagging the reducing end of the sugars with a fluorescent compound (reductive labeling). A large variety of different labels were introduced in the recent years, where 2-aminobenzamide (AB), anthranilic acid (AA), 2-aminopyridin (PA), 2-aminoacridone (AMAC) and 3-(acetylamino)-6-aminoacridine (AA-Ac) are just a few of them.

O-glycans are usually analysed without any tags, due to the chemical release conditions preventing them to be labeled.

Fractionated glycans from high-performance liquid chromatography (HPLC) instruments can be further analyzed by MALDI-TOF-MS(MS) to get further information about structure and purity. Sometimes glycan pools are analyzed directly by mass spectrometry without prefractionation, although a discrimination between isobaric glycan structures is more challenging or even not always possible. Anyway, direct MALDI-TOF-MS analysis can lead to a fast and straightforward illustration of the glycan pool.

In recent years, high performance liquid chromatography online coupled to mass spectrometry became very popular. By choosing porous graphitic carbon as a stationary phase for liquid chromatography, even non derivatized glycans can be analyzed. Detection is here done by mass spectrometry, but in instead of MALDI-MS, electrospray ionisation (ESI) is more frequently used.

=== Multiple Reaction Monitoring (MRM) ===
Although MRM has been used extensively in metabolomics and proteomics, its high sensitivity and linear response over a wide dynamic range make it especially suited for glycan biomarker research and discovery. MRM is performed on a triple quadrupole (QqQ) instrument, which is set to detect a predetermined precursor ion in the first quadrupole, a fragmented in the collision quadrupole, and a predetermined fragment ion in the third quadrupole. It is a non-scanning technique, wherein each transition is detected individually and the detection of multiple transitions occurs concurrently in duty cycles. This technique is being used to characterize the immune glycome.

Table 1:Advantages and disadvantages of mass spectrometry in glycan analysis

Advantages	Disadvantages
Applicable for small sample amounts (lower fmol range); Useful for complex glycan mixtures (generation of a further analysis dimension).; Attachment sides can be analysed by tandem MS experiments (side specific glycan analysis).; Glycan sequencing by tandem MS experiments.	Destructive method.; Need of a proper experimental design.

=== Arrays ===
Lectin and antibody arrays provide high-throughput screening of many samples containing glycans. This method uses either naturally occurring lectins or artificial monoclonal antibodies, where both are immobilized on a certain chip and incubated with a fluorescent glycoprotein sample.

Glycan arrays, like that offered by the Consortium for Functional Glycomics and Z Biotech LLC, contain carbohydrate compounds that can be screened with lectins or antibodies to define carbohydrate specificity and identify ligands.

=== Metabolic and covalent labeling of glycans ===
Metabolic labeling of glycans can be used as a way to detect glycan structures. A well known strategy involves the use of azide-labeled sugars which can be reacted using the Staudinger ligation. This method has been used for in vitro and in vivo imaging of glycans.

=== Tools for glycoproteins ===
X-ray crystallography and nuclear magnetic resonance (NMR) spectroscopy for complete structural analysis of complex glycans is a difficult and complex field. However, the structure of the binding site of numerous lectins, enzymes and other carbohydrate-binding proteins has revealed a wide variety of the structural basis for glycome function. The purity of test samples have been obtained through chromatography (affinity chromatography etc.) and analytical electrophoresis (PAGE (polyacrylamide electrophoresis), capillary electrophoresis, affinity electrophoresis, etc.).

== See also ==
- Glycomics
- Cell adhesion
- Glycolipid
- Glycoprotein
- List of omics topics in biology
