= Bibliome =

The bibliome is the totality of biological text corpus. This term was coined around 2000 in EBI (European Bioinformatics Institute) to denote the importance of biological text information. Similar terms that have been less frequently used are literaturome and textome. By approximate analogy to widely used terms like genome, metabolome, proteome, and transcriptome, this -ome would properly refer to the literature of a specified or contextually implied field, hence: biological bibliome, political bibliome, etc. However the term has not (yet) been applied outside the biological and medical sciences so it currently by default applies just to the biomedical fields. It would make little sense to apply it to a particular body of texts such as MEDLINE, despite a natural analogy that might seem to suggest this: the terms genome, proteome, channelome, metabolome, and transcriptome all usually assume a specific organism or cell set and (except for genome) a specific time point. The reason following this analogy would make little sense is that there is already an established term for this purpose, corpus.

From the bibliome, biologists and computer scientists datamine to discover new gene targets and drugs. Bibliomics is the bioinformatics study of bibliome. Bibliome is not a pseudoome because it is a useful concept that is used by bioinformatists.

== Online applications ==
EAGLi is a biomedical retrieval engine for MEDLINE. GOCat is an Automatic GO categorizer/browser to help functional annotation out of biomedical texts; also useful to functionally characterize protein and gene names lists generated by high-throughput experiments.
