= Plant Proteome Database =

Content
- Description: determine the biological function of each protein in plants.
- Organisms: Arabidopsis thaliana and maize (Zea mays)

Contact
- Primary citation: PMID 18832363

Access
- Website: ppdb.tc.cornell.edu

The Plant Proteome Database is a National Science Foundation-funded project to determine the biological function of each protein in plants. It includes data for two plants that are widely studied in molecular biology, Arabidopsis thaliana and maize (Zea mays). Initially the project was limited to plant plastids, under the name of the Plastid PDB, but was expanded and renamed Plant PDB in November 2007.

== See also ==
- Proteome
