= Mechanome =

The mechanome consists of the body, or ome, of data including cell and molecular processes relating to force and mechanical systems at molecular, cellular and tissue length scales - the fundamental "machine code" structures of the cell. The mechanome encompasses biological motors, like kinesin, myosin, RNAP, and Ribosome mechanical structures, like actin or the cytoskeleton and also proteomic and genomic components that are mechanosensitive and are involved in the response of cells to externally applied force.

A definition of the "mechanome" extending to cell/organ/body given by Prof. Roger Kamm, at the 5th World Congress of Biomechanics Munich, includes understanding: The complete state of stress existing from tissues to cells to molecules. The biological state that results from the distribution of forces. Requires knowledge of the distribution of force throughout the cell/organ/body, the functional interactions between these stresses, and the fundamental biological processes.

The mechanome seeks to understand the fundamental physical-mechanical processes and events that affect biological function. An example at the molecular level includes the common structural designs used by kinesin and myosin motor proteins (such as dimer formation and mechanochemical cycles) that control their function and lead to properties such as processivity. The mechanome assembles the common features of these motors regardless of the "track" (microtubules, actin filaments, nucleotide based structures, membranes) they move on. A cytoskeletal example includes structures such as actin filament networks and bundles that can form from a variety of actin-binding proteins that cross-link or bundle actin filaments, leading to common mechanical changes of these structures. A cell machinery example includes common structures such as contractile ring formation formed by both actin and tubulin type structures leading to the same mechanical result of cell division.

In order to respond to loading cells, a functional mechanome is required, defined as the cellular and extracellular mechanosensitive elements (genomic, proteomic, metabolic etc.) that contribute to the mechanical responsiveness of specific cells within a defined mechanical environment.

Using mechanical force techniques, such as optical tweezers or atomic force microscopy, single proteins can be identified by a unique structural fingerprint.

== Mechanomics ==
Mechanomics is the study of how forces are transmitted and the influence they have on biological function.

Mechanomics is also an emerging field between biology and biomechanics.

Physicomics

Physicomics is the complex of other than mechanical forces involved in cellular physiology and response to its environment. Besides the mechanical one, one should think of other physical parameters such as pressure, temperature, electro-magnetic fields such as light, et cetera.

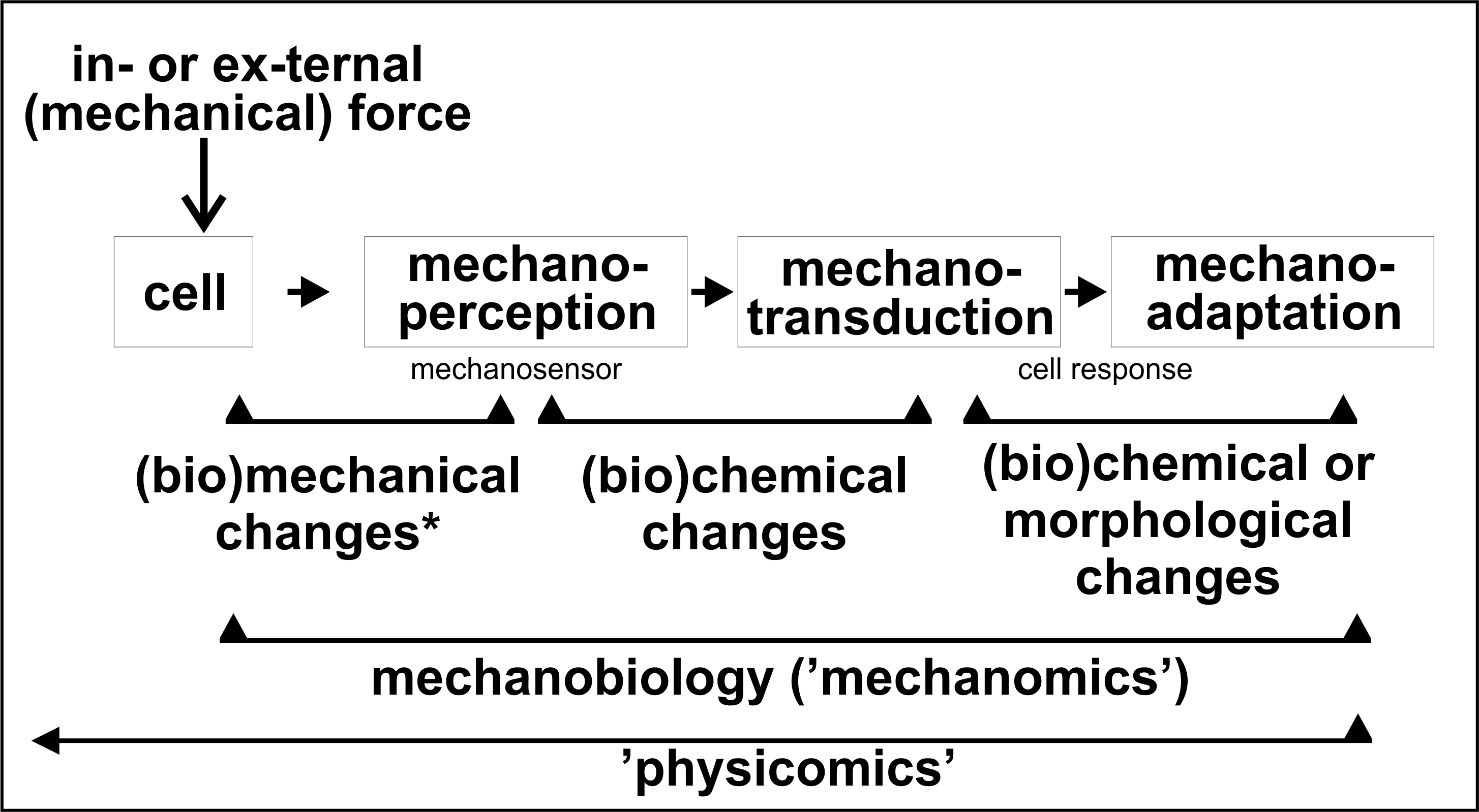
Scheme of terminology and sequence of events in cell biomechanics or broader - biophysics. In mechanobiology we study effects of mechanical forces within and/or applied to a cell or parts of it. This can be termed as mechanomics. Extending this to the overall physical environment and processes around and within a cell we might even use the term ‘physicomics’. See also:

== See also ==
- Biomechanics
- Proteome
