= Lipidome =

Totality of lipids in cells

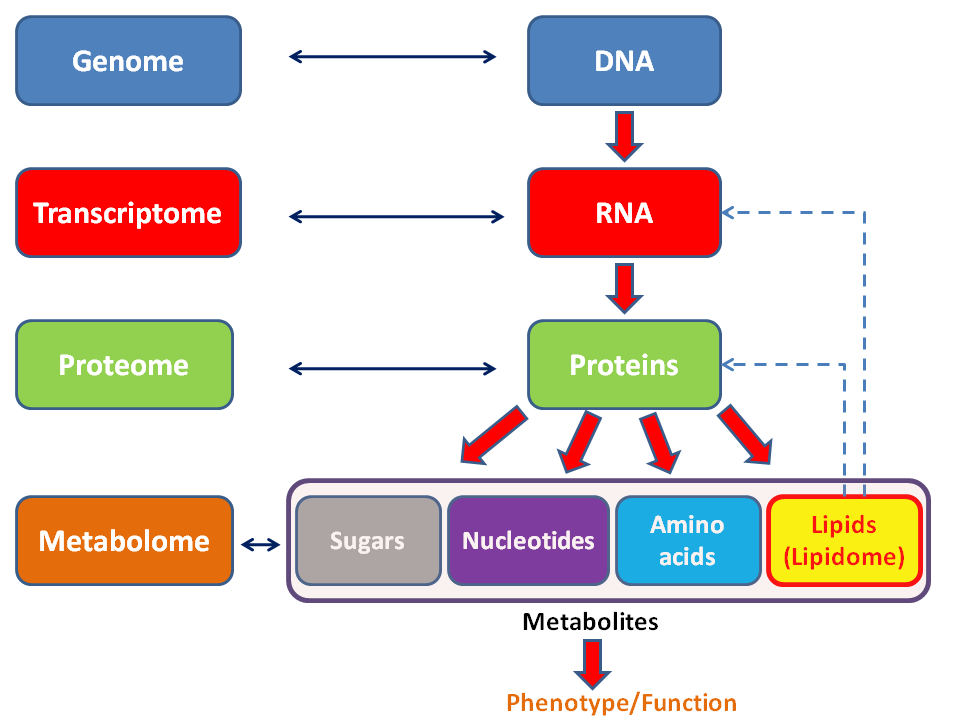
The lipidome (in yellow) as a part of the metabolome and the total interactome of a cell.

The quantitative lipidome (on the level of lipid classes) of yeast Saccharomyces cerevisiae in different phases of growth.

The lipidome refers to the totality of lipids in cells. Lipids are one of the four major molecular components of biological organisms, along with proteins, sugars and nucleic acids. Lipidome is a term coined in the context of omics in modern biology, within the field of lipidomics. It can be studied using mass spectrometry and bioinformatics as well as traditional lab-based methods. The lipidome of a cell can be subdivided into the membrane-lipidome and mediator-lipidome.

The first cell lipidome to be published was that of a mouse macrophage in 2010. The lipidome of the yeast Saccharomyces cerevisiae has been characterised with an estimated 95% coverage; studies of the human lipidome are ongoing. For example, the human plasma lipidome consist of almost 600 distinct molecular species. Research suggests that the lipidome of an individual may be able to indicate cancer risks associated with dietary fats, particularly breast cancer.

== See also ==
- Lipidomics
- Genome
- Proteome
- Glycome
