= Interferome =

Online bioinformatics database

INTERFEROME

Content
- Description: database of interferon regulated genes
- Organisms: Homo sapiens Mus musculus Pan troglodytes

Contact
- Laboratory: Monash Institute of Medical Research; University of Cambridge
- Primary citation: Shamith A Samarajiwa & al. (2009)
- Release date: 2008

Access
- Website: http://www.interferome.org

Interferome is an online bioinformatics database of interferon-regulated genes (IRGs). These Interferon Regulated Genes are also known as Interferon Stimulated Genes (ISGs). The database contains information on type I (IFN alpha, beta), type II (IFN gamma) and type III (IFN lambda) regulated genes and is regularly updated. It is used by the interferon and cytokine research community both as an analysis tool and an information resource. Interferons were identified as antiviral proteins more than 50 years ago. However, their involvement in immunomodulation, cell proliferation, inflammation and other homeostatic processes has been since identified. These cytokines are used as therapeutics in many diseases such as chronic viral infections, cancer and multiple sclerosis. These interferons regulate the transcription of approximately 2000 genes in an interferon subtype, dose, cell type and stimulus dependent manner. This database of interferon regulated genes is an attempt at integrating information from high-throughput experiments and molecular biology databases to gain a detailed understanding of interferon biology.

== Contents ==
Interferome comprises the following data sets:

- Gene expression data of interferon regulated genes from Homo sapiens, Mus musculus, and Pan troglodytes, manually curated from more than 30 public and inhouse microarray and proteomic datasets.

== Tools ==
Interferome offers many ways of searching and retrieving data from the database:

- Identify interferon regulated gene signatures in microarray data;
- Gene Ontology analysis and annotation;
- Normal tissue expression of interferon regulated genes;
- Regulatory analysis of interferon regulated genes;
- BLAST (Basic Local Alignment Search Tool) analysis and orthologue sequence download;

== Interferome Management ==
Interferome is managed by a team at Monash University :Monash Institute of Medical Research and the University of Cambridge
