= Expressome =

Expressome may refer to:

- A supramolecular complex consisting of RNA polymerase and a trailing ribosome linked by a shared mRNA. The expressome complex mediates a mechanism of gene expression regulation termed transcription-translation coupling.
- The whole set of gene expression in a cell, tissue, organ, organisms, and species. Expressome is a slightly larger concept than transcriptome. The transcriptome is the set of transcripts, while expressome includes transcripts, proteins and other ligands (abundance or concentration).

== See also ==
- Bioinformatics
- DNA microarray
- Gel electrophoresis
- Mass spectrometry
- Protein sequencing
- Systems biology
- Expressomics
- List of omics topics in biology
