= Imaging cycler microscopy =

Type of fully automated microscopy

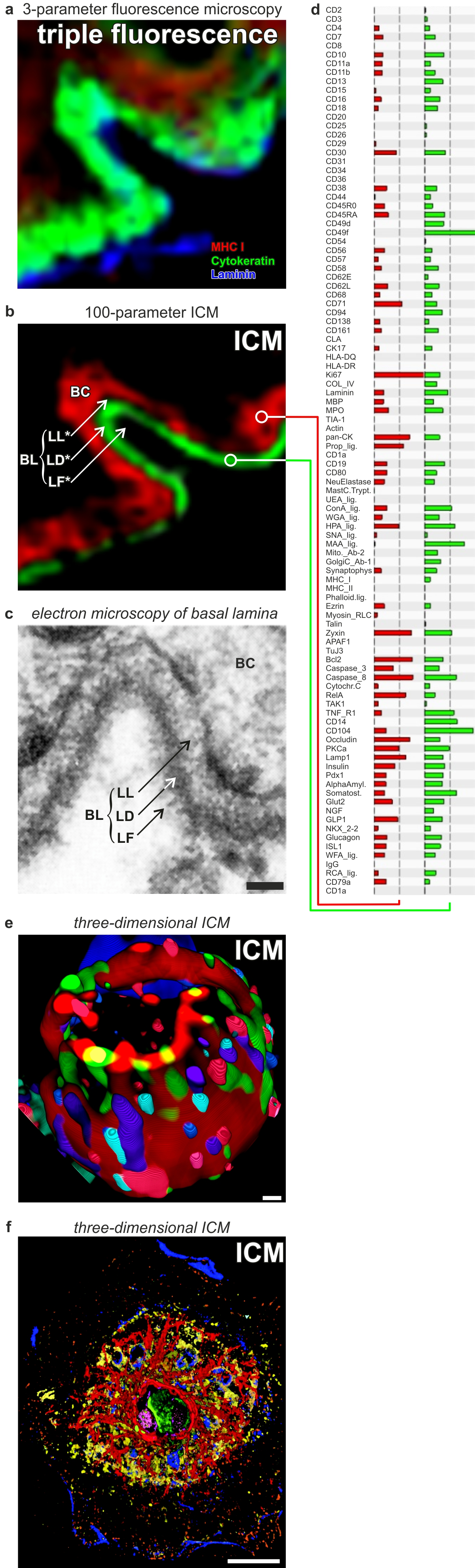
Comparison of dimension-unlimited fluorescence imaging cycler microscopy (ICM) and standard three-parameter fluorescence microscopy

An imaging cycler microscope (ICM) is a fully automated (epi) fluorescence microscope which overcomes the spectral resolution limit resulting in parameter- and dimension-unlimited fluorescence imaging. The principle and robotic device was described by Walter Schubert in 1997 and has been further developed with his co-workers within the human toponome project. The ICM runs robotically controlled repetitive incubation-imaging-bleaching cycles with dye-conjugated probe libraries recognizing target structures in situ (biomolecules in fixed cells or tissue sections). This results in the transmission of a randomly large number of distinct biological informations by re-using the same fluorescence channel after bleaching for the transmission of another biological information using the same dye which is conjugated to another specific probe, a.s.o. Thereby noise-reduced quasi-multichannel fluorescence images with reproducible physical, geometrical, and biophysical stabilities are generated. The resulting power of combinatorial molecular discrimination (PCMD) per data point is given by 65,536^{k}, where 65,536 is the number of grey value levels (output of a 16-bit CCD camera), and k is the number of co-mapped biomolecules and/or subdomains per biomolecule(s). High PCMD has been shown for k = 100, and in principle can be expanded for much higher numbers of k. In contrast to traditional multichannel–few-parameter fluorescence microscopy (panel a in the figure) high PCMDs in an ICM lead to high functional and spatial resolution (panel b in the figure). Systematic ICM analysis of biological systems reveals the supramolecular segregation law that describes the principle of order of large, hierarchically organized biomolecular networks in situ (toponome). The ICM is the core technology for the systematic mapping of the complete protein network code in tissues (human toponome project). The original ICM method includes any modification of the bleaching step. Corresponding modifications have been reported for antibody retrieval and chemical dye-quenching debated recently. The Toponome Imaging Systems (TIS) and multi-epitope-ligand cartographs (MELC) represent different stages of the ICM technological development. Imaging cycler microscopy received the American ISAC best paper award in 2008 for the three symbol code of organized proteomes.
