= Embryomics =

Study of cell types during embryogenesis

Embryomics is the identification, characterization and study of the diverse cell types which arise during embryogenesis, especially as this relates to the location and developmental history of cells in the embryo. Cell type may be determined according to several criteria: location in the developing embryo, gene expression as indicated by protein and nucleic acid markers and surface antigens, and also position on the embryogenic tree.

== Embryome ==
There are many cell markers useful in distinguishing, classifying, separating and purifying the numerous cell types present at any given time in a developing organism. These cell markers consist of select RNAs and proteins present inside, and surface antigens present on the surface of, the cells making up the embryo. For any given cell type, these RNA and protein markers reflect the genes characteristically active in that cell type. The catalog of all these cell types and their characteristic markers is known as the organism's embryome. The word is a portmanteau of embryo and genome. “Embryome” may also refer to the totality of the physical cell markers themselves.

== Embryogenesis ==
As an embryo develops from a fertilized egg, the single egg cell splits into many cells, which grow in number and migrate to the appropriate locations inside the embryo at appropriate times during development. As the embryo's cells grow in number and migrate, they also differentiate into an increasing number of different cell types, ultimately turning into the stable, specialized cell types characteristic of the adult organism. Each of the cells in an embryo contains the same genome, characteristic of the species, but the level of activity of each of the many thousands of genes that make up the complete genome varies with, and determines, a particular cell's type (e.g. neuron, bone cell, skin cell, muscle cell, etc.).

During embryo development (embryogenesis), many cell types are present which are not present in the adult organism. These temporary cells are called progenitor cells, and are intermediate cell types which disappear during embryogenesis by turning into other progenitor cells, or into mature adult somatic cell types, or which disappear due to programmed cell death (apoptosis).

The entire process of embryogenesis can be described with the aid of two maps: an embryo map, a temporal sequence of three-dimensional images of the developing embryo, showing the location of cells of the many cell types present in the embryo at a given time, and an embryogenic tree, a diagram showing how the cell types are derived from each other during embryogenesis.

The embryo map is a sequence of 3D images, or slices of 3D images, of the developing embryo which, if viewed rapidly in temporal order, forms a time-lapse view of the growing embryo.

The embryogenic tree is a diagram which shows the temporal development of each of the cell lines in the embryo. When drawn on a piece of paper, this diagram takes the form of a tree, analogous to the evolutionary tree of life which illustrates the development of life on Earth. However, instead of each branch on this tree representing a species, as in the tree of life, each branch represents a particular cell type present in the embryo at a particular time. And of course, an embryogenic tree covers the gestation period of weeks or months, instead of billions of years, as in the case of the evolutionary tree of life.

Human embryogenesis is the referent here, but embryogenesis in other vertebrate species closely follows the same pattern. The egg cell (ovum), after fertilization with a sperm cell, becomes the zygote, represented by the trunk at the very bottom of the tree. This single zygote cell divides in two, three times, forming first a cluster of two-cells, then four-cells, and finally eight-cells. One more cell division brings the number of cells to 16, at which time it is called a morula, instead of a zygote. This ball of 16 cells then reorganizes into a hollow sphere called a blastocyst. As the number of cells grows from 16 to between 40 and 150, the blastocyst differentiates into two layers, an outer sphere of cells called the trophoblast and an inner cell mass called the embryoblast.

The spherical outer cell layer (trophoblast), after implantation in the wall of the uterus, further differentiates and grows to form the placenta.

The cells of the inner cell mass (embryoblast), which are known as human embryonic stem cells (hESCs), will further differentiate to form four structures: the amnion, the yolk sac, the allantois, and the embryo itself. Human embryonic stem cells are pluripotent, that is, they can differentiate into any of the cell types present in the adult human, and into any of the intermediate progenitor cell types that eventually turn into the adult cell lines. hESCs are also immortal, in that they can divide and grow in number indefinitely, without undergoing either differentiation or cellular aging (cellular senescence).

The first differentiation of the hESCs that form the embryo proper, is into three cell types known as the germ layers: the ectoderm, the mesoderm, and the endoderm. The ectoderm eventually forms the skin (including hair and nails), mucous membranes and nervous system. The mesoderm forms the skeleton and muscles, heart and circulatory system, urinary and reproductive systems, and connective tissues inside the body. The endoderm forms the gastrointestinal tract (stomach and intestines), the respiratory tract, and the endocrine system (liver and endocrine glands).

== Mapping the embryogenic tree ==
A primary goal in embryomics is a complete mapping the embryogenic tree: Identifying each of the cell types present in the developing embryo and placing it in the tree on its proper branch. There is an unknown number, probably thousands, of distinct cell types present in the developing embryo, including progenitor cell lines which are only temporarily present and which disappear either by differentiating into the permanent somatic cell types which make up the tissues of the infant's body at birth (or into other progenitor cell lines), or by undergoing the programmed cell death process known as apoptosis.

Each cell type is defined by which genes are characteristically active in that cell type. A particular gene in a cell's genome codes for the production of a particular protein, that is, when that gene is turned on (active), the protein coded for by that gene is produced and present somewhere in the cell. Production of a particular protein involves the production of a particular mRNA (messenger RNA) sequence as an intermediate step in protein synthesis. This mRNA is produced by copying process called transcription, from the DNA in the cell's nucleus. The mRNA so produced travels from the nucleus into the cytoplasm, where it encounters and latches onto ribosomes stuck to the cytoplasmic side of the endoplasmic reticulum. Attachment of the mRNA strand to the ribosome initiates the production of the protein coded for by the mRNA strand. Therefore, the profile of active genes in a cell is reflected in the presence or absence of corresponding proteins and mRNA strands in the cell's cytoplasm, and antigen proteins present on the cell's outer membrane. Discovering, determining and classifying cells as to their type therefore involves detecting and measuring the type and amount of specific protein and RNA molecules present in the cells.

In addition, mapping the tree of embryogenesis involves assigning to each specific, identifiable cell type, a particular branch, or place, in the tree. This requires knowing the “ancestry” of each cell type, that is, which cell type preceded it in the development process. This information can be deduced by observing in detail the distribution and placement of cells, by type, in the developing embryo, and by also observing, in cells growing in culture (“in vitro”) any differentiation events, should they occur for whatever reason, and by other means.

Cells, embryonic cells in particular, are sensitive to the presence or absence of specific chemical molecules in their surroundings. This is the basis for cell signaling, and during embryogenesis cells “talk to each other” by emitting and receiving signalling molecules. This is how development of the embryo's structure is organized and controlled. If cells of a particular line have been removed from the embryo and are growing alone in a Petri dish in the lab, and some cell signaling chemicals are put in the growth medium bathing the cells, this can induce the cells to differentiate into a different, “daughter” cell type, mimicking the differentiation process that occurs naturally in the developing embryo. Artificially inducing differentiation in this way can yield clues to the correct placement of a particular cell line in the embryogenic tree, by observing what kind of cell results from inducing the differentiation.

In the laboratory, human embryonic stem cells growing in culture can be induced to differentiate into progenitor cells by exposing the hESCs to chemicals (e.g. protein growth and differentiation factors) present in the developing embryo. The progenitor cells so produced may then be isolated into pure colonies, grown in culture, and then classified according to type and assigned positions in the embryogenic tree. Such purified cultures of progenitor cells may be used in research to study disease processes in vitro, as diagnostic tools, or potentially developed for use in regenerative medicine therapies.

== Regenerative medicine ==
Embryomics is the core science supporting the development of regenerative medicine. Regenerative medicine involves use of specially grown cells, tissues and organs as therapeutic agents to cure disease and repair injury, and springs from the development of mammalian cloning technology. Other medical and surgical methods may use chemicals (pharmaceuticals) as therapeutic agents, or involve removal of injured or diseased tissue (surgery), or use inserted tissues or organs (transplant surgery). Use of transplanted tissue or organs in medicine is not classified as regenerative medicine, because the tissues and organs were not grown specifically for use as therapeutic agents.

Ultimately, one of the goals of regenerative medicine and applied embryomics, is the creation of cells, tissues and organs grown from cells taken from the patient to be treated. This would be accomplished by reprogramming adult stem or somatic cells removed from the patient, so that these cells revert to the pluripotent, embryonic state. These synthetic stem cells would then be grown in culture and differentiated into the appropriate cell type indicated for treating the patient's disease or injury. The advantages here over current therapies are: elimination of immune rejection accompanying allograft transplantation, creation of a full complement of cells, tissues and organs as needed, and creation of youthful cells, tissues and organs for transplant and rejuvenation.

Embryomics also includes the application of embryomic data and theory, to the development of practical methods for evaluating, classifying, culturing, purifying, differentiating and manipulating human embryonic cells.

== Bibliography ==
- West, Michael D. (September 16, 2003). The Immortal Cell (1st ed.). Doubleday.
- Pansky, Ben (December 1, 1982). Review of Medical Embryology. Macmillan.
- Standring, Susan (November 21, 2008). Gray's Anatomy (40th ed.). Churchill Livingstone.
- Thomson, J. A.; Itskovitz-Eldor, J; Shapiro, SS; Waknitz, MA; Swiergiel, JJ; Marshall, VS; Jones, JM (1998). "Embryonic Stem Cell Lines Derived from Human Blastocysts". Science. 282 (5391): 1145–7. Bibcode:1998Sci...282.1145T. doi:10.1126/science.282.5391.1145. PMID 9804556.
