= Cytomics =

Single-cell biology and biochemistry

Cells shown with immunostaining observed with a confocal microscope.

Cytomics is the study of cell biology (cytology) and biochemistry in cellular systems at the single cell level. It combines all the bioinformatic knowledge to attempt to understand the molecular architecture and functionality of the cell system (Cytome). Much of this is achieved by using molecular and microscopic techniques that allow the various components of a cell to be visualised as they interact in vivo.

== Cytome ==
Cytomes are the cellular systems, subsystems, and functional components of the body. The cytome is the collection of the complex and dynamic cellular processes (structure and function) underlying physiological processes. It describes the structural and functional heterogeneity of the cellular diversity of an organism.

== Human Cytome Project ==
The Human Cytome Project is aimed at the study of the biological system structure and function of an organism at the cytome level.

== See also ==
- Flow cytometry
- Genomics
- Omics
- Proteomics
- Lipidomics
- List of omics topics in biology
- Metabolomics
