= Volatilome =

All the volatile organic and inorganic compounds released by an organism

The volatilome (sometimes termed volatolome or volatome) contains all of the volatile metabolites as well as other volatile organic and inorganic compounds that originate from an organism, super-organism, or ecosystem. The atmosphere of a living planet could be regarded as its volatilome. While all volatile metabolites in the volatilome can be thought of as a subset of the metabolome, the volatilome also contains exogenously derived compounds that do not derive from metabolic processes (e.g. environmental contaminants), therefore the volatilome can be regarded as a distinct entity from the metabolome. The volatilome is a component of the 'aura' of molecules and microbes (the 'microbial cloud') that surrounds all organisms.

== Odor profile ==
All volatile metabolites detectable by the human nose are termed an 'odour profile'. The association of altered odour profiles with disease states has long been documented in both eastern and western medicine, and recent advances in robotic sample introduction have increased interest in the volatilome as a source for biomarkers that can be used for non-invasive screening for disease. Volatile profiles can be collected via active or passive sampling and analysis is predominantly undertaken using gas chromatography–mass spectrometry, with a variety of direct or indirect sample introduction techniques.

== See also ==
- Electronic nose
