= Toponome =

Biological term

The toponome is the spatial network code of proteins and other biomolecules in morphologically intact cells and tissues. It is mapped and decoded by imaging cycler microscopy (ICM) in situ able to co-map many thousand supermolecules in one sample (tissue section or cell sample at high subcellular resolution). The term "toponome" is derived from the ancient Greek nouns "topos" (τόπος: "place, position") and "nomos" (νόμος: "law"), and the term "toponomics" refers to the study of the toponome. It was introduced by Walter Schubert in 2003. It addresses the fact that the network of biomolecules in cells and tissues follows topological rules enabling coordinated actions. For example, the cell surface toponome provides the spatial protein interaction code for the execution of a cell movement, a "code of conduct". This is intrinsically dependent on the specific spatial arrangement of similar and dissimilar compositions of supermolecules (compositional periodicity) with a specific spatial order along a cell surface membrane. This spatial order is periodically repeated when the cell tries to enter the exploratory state from the spherical state (spatial periodicity). This spatial toponome code is hierarchically organized with lead biomolecule(s), anti-colocated (absent) biomolecule(s) and wildcard molecules which are variably associated with the lead biomolecule(s). It has been shown that inhibition of lead molecule(s) in a surface membrane leads to disassembly of the corresponding biomolecular network and loss of function.
