= Cancer systems biology =

Application of systems biology approaches to cancer research

Cancer systems biology encompasses the application of systems biology approaches to cancer research, in order to study the disease as a complex adaptive system with emerging properties at multiple biological scales. Cancer systems biology represents the application of systems biology approaches to the analysis of how the intracellular networks of normal cells are perturbed during carcinogenesis to develop effective predictive models that can assist scientists and clinicians in the validations of new therapies and drugs. Tumours are characterized by genomic and epigenetic instability that alters the functions of many different molecules and networks in a single cell as well as altering the interactions with the local environment. Cancer systems biology approaches, therefore, are based on the use of computational and mathematical methods to decipher the complexity in tumorigenesis as well as cancer heterogeneity.

Cancer systems biology encompasses concrete applications of systems biology approaches to cancer research, notably (a) the need for better methods to distill insights from large-scale networks, (b) the importance of integrating multiple data types in constructing more realistic models, (c) challenges in translating insights about tumorigenic mechanisms into therapeutic interventions, and (d) the role of the tumor microenvironment, at the physical, cellular, and molecular levels. Cancer systems biology therefore adopts a holistic view of cancer aimed at integrating its many biological scales, including genetics, signaling networks, epigenetics, cellular behavior, mechanical properties, histology, clinical manifestations and epidemiology. Ultimately, cancer properties at one scale, e.g., histology, are explained by properties at a scale below, e.g., cell behavior.

Cancer systems biology merges traditional basic and clinical cancer research with "exact" sciences, such as applied mathematics, engineering, and physics. It incorporates a spectrum of "omics" technologies (genomics, proteomics, epigenomics, etc.) and molecular imaging, to generate computational algorithms and quantitative models that shed light on mechanisms underlying the cancer process and predict response to intervention. Application of cancer systems biology include but are not limited to- elucidating critical cellular and molecular networks underlying cancer risk, initiation and progression; thereby promoting an alternative viewpoint to the traditional reductionist approach which has typically focused on characterizing single molecular aberrations.

== History ==
Cancer systems biology finds its roots in a number of events and realizations in biomedical research, as well as in technological advances. Historically cancer was identified, understood, and treated as a monolithic disease. It was seen as a "foreign" component that grew as a homogenous mass, and was to be best treated by excision. Besides the continued impact of surgical intervention, this simplistic view of cancer has drastically evolved. In parallel with the exploits of molecular biology, cancer research focused on the identification of critical oncogenes or tumor suppressor genes in the etiology of cancer. These breakthroughs revolutionized our understanding of molecular events driving cancer progression. Targeted therapy may be considered the current pinnacle of advances spawned by such insights.

Despite these advances, many unresolved challenges remain, including the dearth of new treatment avenues for many cancer types, or the unexplained treatment failures and inevitable relapse in cancer types where targeted treatment exists. Such mismatch between clinical results and the massive amounts of data acquired by omics technology highlights the existence of basic gaps in our knowledge of cancer fundamentals. Cancer Systems Biology is steadily improving our ability to organize information on cancer, in order to fill these gaps. Key developments include:

- The generation of comprehensive molecular datasets (genome, transcriptome, epigenomics, proteome, metabolome, etc.)
- The Cancer Genome Atlas data collection
- Computational algorithms to extract drivers of cancer progression from existing datasets
- Statistical and mechanistic modeling of signaling networks
- Quantitative modeling of cancer evolutionary processes
- Mathematical modeling of cancer cell population growth
- Mathematical modeling of cellular responses to therapeutic intervention
- Mathematical modeling of cancer metabolism

The practice of Cancer Systems Biology requires close physical integration between scientists with diverse backgrounds. Critical large-scale efforts are also underway to train a new workforce fluent in both the languages of biology and applied mathematics. At the translational level, Cancer Systems Biology should engender precision medicine application to cancer treatment.

== Resources ==
High-throughput technologies enable comprehensive genomic analyses of mutations, rearrangements, copy number variations, and methylation at the cellular and tissue levels, as well as robust analysis of RNA and microRNA expression data, protein levels and metabolite levels.

List of High-Throughput Technologies and the Data they generated, with representative databases and publications

Technology	Experimental data	Representative database
DNA-seq, NGS	DNA sequences, exome sequences, genomes, genes	TCGA, GenBank, DDBJ, Ensembl
Microarray, RNA-seq	Gene expression levels, microRNA levels, transcripts	GEO, Expression Atlas
MS, iTRAQ	Protein concentration, phosphorylations	GPMdb, PRIDE, Human Protein Atlas
C-MS, GC-MS, NMR	Metabolite levels	HMDB
ChIP-chip, ChIP-seq	Protein-DNA interactions, transcript factor binding sites	GEO, TRANSFAC, JASPAR, ENCODE
CLIP-seq, PAR-CLIP, iCLIP	MicroRNA-mRNA regulations	StarBase, miRTarBase
Y2H, AP/MS, MaMTH, maPPIT	Protein-protein interactions	HPRD, BioGRID
Protein microarray	Kinase–substrate interactions	TCGA, PhosphoPOINT
SGA, E-MAP, RNAi	Genetic interactions	HPRD, BioGRID
SNP genotyping array	GWAS loci, eQTL, aberrant SNPs	GWAS Catalog, dbGAP, dbSNP
LUMIER, data integration	Signaling pathways, metabolic pathways, molecular signatures	TCGA, KEGG, Reactome

== Approaches ==
The computational approaches used in cancer systems biology include new mathematical and computational algorithms that reflect the dynamic interplay between experimental biology and the quantitative sciences. A cancer systems biology approach can be applied at different levels, from an individual cell to a tissue, a patient with a primary tumour and possible metastases, or to any combination of these situations. This approach can integrate the molecular characteristics of tumours at different levels (DNA, RNA, protein, epigenetic, imaging) and different intervals (seconds versus days) with multidisciplinary analysis. One of the major challenges to its success, besides the challenge posed by the heterogeneity of cancer per se, resides in acquiring high-quality data that describe clinical characteristics, pathology, treatment, and outcomes and integrating the data into robust predictive models

== Applications ==
- Modelling Cancer Growth and Development

Mathematical modeling can provide useful context for the rational design, validation and prioritization of novel cancer drug targets and their combinations. Network-based modeling and multi-scale modeling have begun to show promise in facilitating the process of effective cancer drug discovery. Using a systems network modeling approach, Schoerberl et al. identified a previously unknown, complementary and potentially superior mechanism of inhibiting the ErbB receptor signaling network. ErbB3 was found to be the most sensitive node, leading to Akt activation; Akt regulates many biological processes, such as proliferation, apoptosis and growth, which are all relevant to tumor progression. This target driven modelling has paved way for first of its kind clinical trials. Bekkal et al. presented a nonlinear model of the dynamics of a cell population divided into proliferative and quiescent compartments. The proliferative phase represents the complete cell cycle (G (1)-S-G (2)-M) of a population committed to divide at its end. The asymptotic behavior of solutions of the nonlinear model is analysed in two cases, exhibiting tissue homeostasis or tumor exponential growth. The model is simulated and its analytic predictions are confirmed numerically. Furthermore, advances in hardware and software have enabled the realization of clinically feasible, quantitative multimodality imaging of tissue pathophysiology. Earlier efforts relating to multimodality imaging of cancer have focused on the integration of anatomical and functional characteristics, such as PET-CT and single-photon emission CT (SPECT-CT), whereas more-recent advances and applications have involved the integration of multiple quantitative, functional measurements (for example, multiple PET tracers, varied MRI contrast mechanisms, and PET-MRI), thereby providing a more-comprehensive characterization of the tumour phenotype. The enormous amount of complementary quantitative data generated by such studies is beginning to offer unique insights into opportunities to optimize care for individual patients. Although important technical optimization and improved biological interpretation of multimodality imaging findings are needed, this approach can already be applied informatively in clinical trials of cancer therapeutics using existing tools.

- Cancer Genomics
- Statistical and mechanistic modelling of cancer progression and development
- Clinical response models / Modelling cellular response to therapeutic interventions
- Sub-typing in Cancer.
- Systems Oncology - Clinical application of Cancer Systems Biology

== National funding efforts ==
In 2004, the US National Cancer Institute launched a program effort on Integrative Cancer Systems Biology to establish Centers for Cancer Systems Biology that focus on the analysis of cancer as a complex biological system. The integration of experimental biology with mathematical modeling will result in new insights in the biology and new approaches to the management of cancer. The program brings clinical and basic cancer researchers together with researchers from mathematics, physics, engineering, information technology, imaging sciences, and computer science to work on unraveling fundamental questions in the biology of cancer.

== See also ==
- Systems biology
- Bioconductor
