= Ivan Erill =

Spanish computational biologist

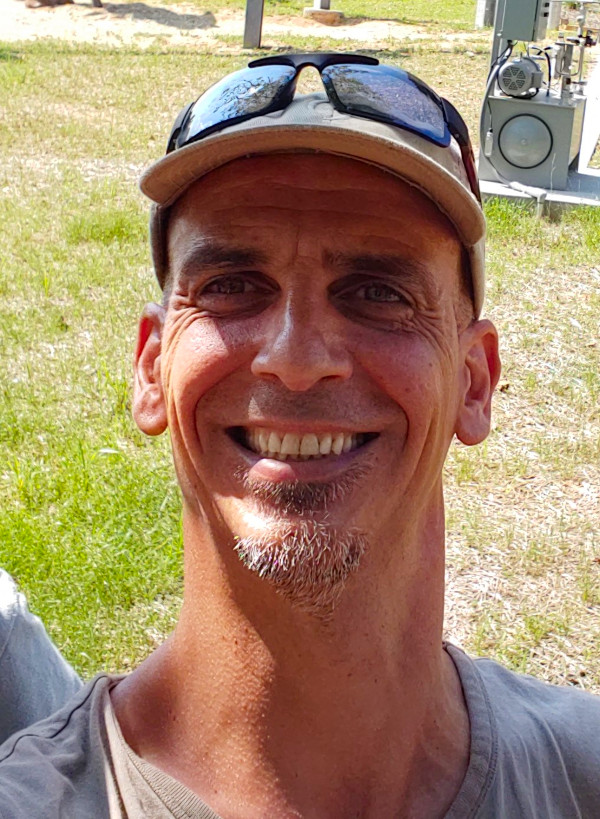
- Ivan Erill in 2019.
- Born: 1972 (age 53–54); Spain
- Education: Autonomous University of Barcelona (BS); Autonomous University of Barcelona (PhD)
- Known for: bacterial comparative genomics
- Scientific career
- Fields: Genomics; Molecular evolution; Computational biology; Gene regulation; Ontologies
- Workplaces: Microelectronics Institute of Barcelona; Autonomous University of Barcelona; University of Maryland, Baltimore County
- Thesis: High-speed Polymerase chain reaction in CMOS-compatible chips (2003)
- Doctoral advisor: Jordi Barbé; Jordi Aguiló
- Website: erilllab.umbc.edu

Ivan Erill is a Spanish computational biologist known for his research in comparative genomics and molecular microbiology. His work focuses primarily on bacterial comparative genomics, through the development of computational methods for analyzing regulatory networks and their evolution.

== Education and career ==
Ivan Erill obtained a B.S. in Computer Science in 1996 and a PhD in Computer Science in 2003 from the Autonomous University of Barcelona, for his work on the design of microelectromechanical systems for DNA analysis at the CSIC Microelectronics Institute of Barcelona . In 2008 he became an assistant professor at the Department of Biological Sciences of the University of Maryland, Baltimore County. He promoted to associate professor in 2014 and to full professor in 2022.

== Research ==
Ivan Erill initiated his research career working on the development of microelectromechanical systems for biomedical applications. His work featured the design of PCR and DNA electrophoresis devices on CMOS-compatible substrates to facilitate the integration of on-chip control and detection circuitry and the design of sensing microneedles to monitor heart ischemia and organ grafts, leading to the first continuous monitoring of transplant organ temperature during transportation.

His work on microbial comparative genomics has focused primarily on the study of transcription regulatory networks. Working on the SOS response as a model network, Erill developed RCGScanner and later CGB to analyze the evolution of this transcriptional system in multiple bacterial groups, revealing that this response against DNA damage is evolutionary based on translesion synthesis and not DNA repair as traditionally assumed. In collaboration with other groups, he has described multiple divergent binding motifs for the SOS transcriptional repressor, and shown that SOS networks can be regulated by transcriptional repressors encoded by bacteriophages.

Erill's work has focused also on the evolutionary dynamics of transcription factors and their binding sites, using evolutionary simulations and information theory-based analyses, as well as comparative analyses of TF-binding motifs leveraging the CollecTF database developed by his laboratory. He has also applied genomics approaches to elucidate the evolution of antibiotic resistance genes and their dissemination, revealing that resistance genes may predate the development of antimicrobial compounds, and that antibiotics can induce the dissemination of resistance genes by inducing lateral gene transfer mediated by integrons and other mobile genetic elements.
