= Envirome =

Total set of environmental factors affecting an organism

An envirome is the total set of environmental factors, both present, and past, that affect the state, and in particular the disease state, of an organism. The study of the envirome and its effects is termed enviromics. The concept relates the core of environmental conditions with the successful biological performance of living beings, and was created in genetic epidemiology.

The term was first coined in the field of psychiatric epidemiology by J.C. Anthony in 1995. More recently, use of the term has been extended to the cellular domain, where cell functional enviromics studies both the genome and envirome from a systems biology perspective. In plants, enviromics is directly related to complex ecophysiology, in which the wide environment of the plants, into an omics scale, can be dissected and understood as a mosaic of possible growing factors and the balance of diverse resources available. In ecology, this concept can be related to the Shelford's law of tolerance.

Enviromics is conceived as a pillar of modern plant breeding, capable to connect the design and development of breeding goals concealing it with the agronomic targets for a climate-smart agriculture. It also has the ability to bridge the knowledge gaps between the different levels of systems biology and phenomics in the context of Gene–environment interaction.

== Envirome classification in humans ==
While there can be both positive and negative effects of the envirome on the organism, negative effects are often emphasized in discussing disease. A typology of envirome health hazards suggested by McDowall is natural physico-chemical, man-made physico-chemical, biological/organic, natural or man-made, macrosocial, micro- or psychosocial. One approach to classifying the envirome is to organize the factors based on their likely disease-specific causality such as cardiovascular disease.

The time-scale of the envirome hazard is another possible dimension of classification; an envirome hazard are said to be a sudden change (such as a disaster), a rapid environmental change, or a slow change or a static situation. In twin studies, envirome influences are often decomposed into shared environmental factors, common to both twins and non-shared environmental factors that differ between the twins.

== Envirome classification in plants ==
In plants, the enviromics term was probably first scientifically mentioned by Xu, in his iconic article on Envirotyping, and also comprehensively described by Resende et al., which is the field of applied data science that integrates databases of environmental factors into quantitative genetics. Then, it can leverage an important plant ecophysiology knowledge capable to bridge the gaps about how the environment acts across different levels of the systems biology (genes, transcripts, proteins, and metabolites). Consequently, it can boost the ability to better understand/model the phenotypic plasticity of the main agronomic traits under diverse growing conditions. The plant breeding community has experienced reduced costs for acquiring environmental sensors (e.g., weather stations) to be installed in the field trials while increasing the reliability and resolution of the remote sensing techniques. The combination of those two factors has started the spring of enviromics-aided breeding in recent years. Recently, Costa-Neto et al. introduced the concept of enviromic-aided genomic prediction involving the use of adaptation typologies to process the raw environmental data into a reliable descriptor of the environmental diversity. This data is then used for training accurate GxE prediction models, mostly involving molecular breeding protocols in agriculture and forestry improvement.

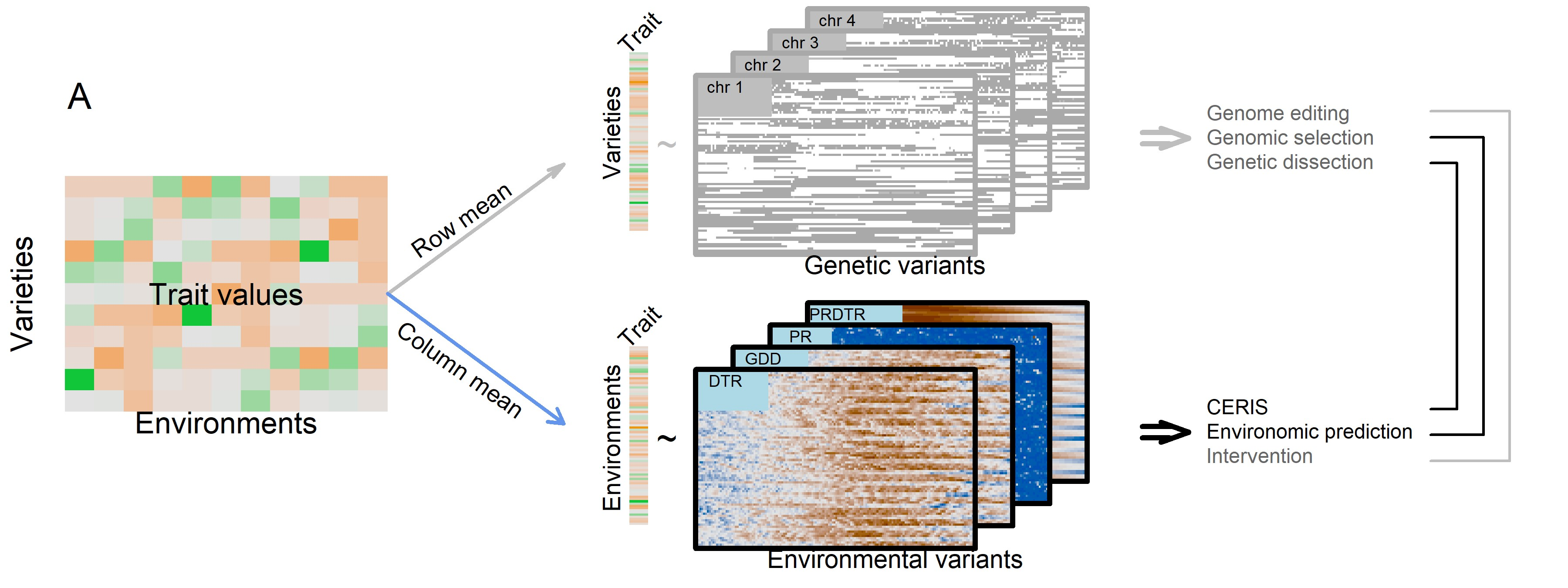
Genetic methods can be applied to elucidate the phenotypic variations caused by enviromics.

Phenotypic plasticity, the ability of an organism to express different traits in response to internal and external environmental factors, is influenced by both genetic and environmental factors. Similar to how genetics approaches have been used to identify and predict performance based on genetic markers, the contribution of environmental factors to phenotypic plasticity can be systematically analyzed and predicted. The Critical Environmental Regressor through Informed Search (CERIS) uses whole-season environmental variants to identify major explicit environmental conditions that contribute to performance, similar to how QTL/ GWAS analysis identifies major genes from genome-wide markers. Enviromic prediction can be used to predict how an organism will perform under new growth conditions based on analysis of the whole-season environmental variants, akin to how genomic prediction is used to predict the performance of new genotypes.

== Genotype-environment correlation and interaction ==
The effect of an envirome on an organism can be potentially modulated by its genetic makeup, i.e., its genome. The two main ways genes and environment may interact is through genotype-environment correlation and interaction. Genotype-environment correlation occurs because, for example, children both inherit genes from their parents and live under the influence of their parents. In the context of genetic epidemiology, interaction refers to the genes and the environment both participating in a causal way that departs from a simple additive model of the effects. An example of a genotype-environment interaction is the increased risk of getting Alzheimer's disease following a head injury in persons carrying the APOE $\epsilon 4$ allele.

== Criticism in human health ==
Some researchers see envirome as a renaming of the already well-established nurture component of the nature-nurture dichotomy in explaining psychological behavior. Steven Rose has argued that in psychiatry, it is time to abandon the genome-envirome dichotomy altogether in favor of an integrative view of a person's life course.

== See also ==
- Environmental epidemiology
- Epidemiology
- Exposome
- Molecular epidemiology
- Ecophysiology
- Quantitative Genetics
- Phenomics
