= Lipidomics =

Study of complete lipid profile in organisms

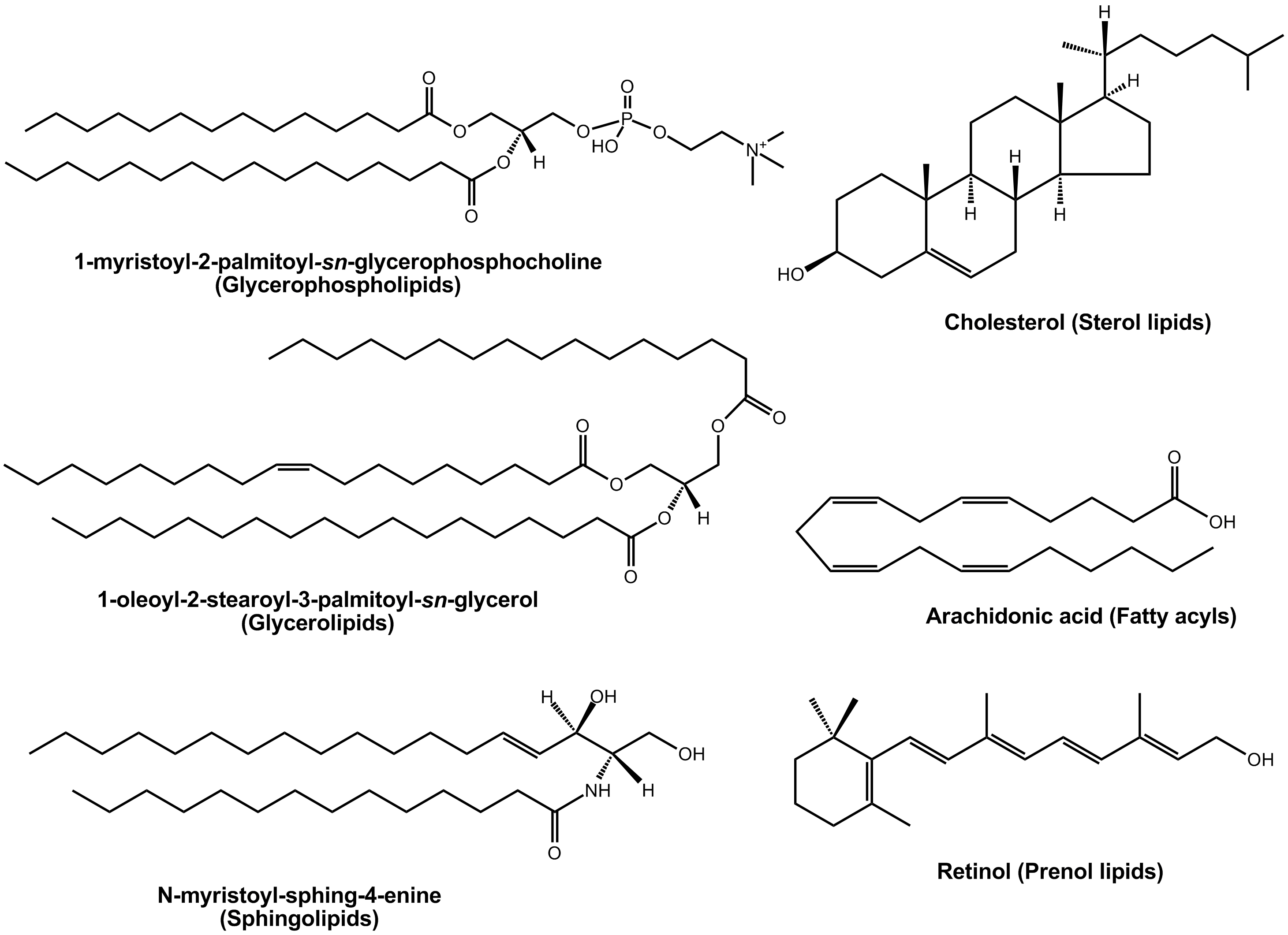
Examples of various lipid species.

Lipidomics is the large-scale study of pathways and networks of cellular lipids in biological systems. The word "lipidome" is used to describe the complete lipid profile within a cell, tissue, organism, or ecosystem and is a subset of the "metabolome" which also includes other major classes of biological molecules (such as amino acids, sugars, glycolysis & TCA intermediates, and nucleic acids). Lipidomics is a relatively recent research field that has been driven by rapid advances in technologies such as mass spectrometry (MS), nuclear magnetic resonance (NMR) spectroscopy, fluorescence spectroscopy, dual polarisation interferometry and computational methods, coupled with the recognition of the role of lipids in many metabolic diseases such as obesity, atherosclerosis, stroke, hypertension and diabetes. This rapidly expanding field complements the huge progress made in genomics and proteomics, all of which constitute the family of systems biology.

Lipidomics research involves the identification and quantification of the thousands of cellular lipid molecular species and their interactions with other lipids, proteins, and other metabolites. Investigators in lipidomics examine the structures, functions, interactions, and dynamics of cellular lipids and the changes that occur during perturbation of the system.

Han and Gross first defined the field of lipidomics through integrating the specific chemical properties inherent in lipid molecular species with a comprehensive mass spectrometric approach. Although lipidomics is under the umbrella of the more general field of "metabolomics", lipidomics is itself a distinct discipline due to the uniqueness and functional specificity of lipids relative to other metabolites.

In lipidomic research, a vast amount of information quantitatively describing the spatial and temporal alterations in the content and composition of different lipid molecular species is accrued after perturbation of a cell through changes in its physiological or pathological state. Information obtained from these studies facilitates mechanistic insights into changes in cellular function. Therefore, lipidomic studies play an essential role in defining the biochemical mechanisms of lipid-related disease processes through identifying alterations in cellular lipid metabolism, trafficking and homeostasis. The growing attention on lipid research is also seen from the initiatives underway of the LIPID Metabolites And Pathways Strategy (LIPID MAPS Consortium). and The European Lipidomics Initiative (ELIfe).

== Structural diversity of lipids ==
Lipids are a diverse and ubiquitous group of compounds which have many key biological functions, such as acting as structural components of cell membranes, serving as energy storage sources and participating in signaling pathways. Lipids may be broadly defined as hydrophobic or amphipathic small molecules that originate entirely or in part from two distinct types of biochemical subunits or "building blocks": ketoacyl and isoprene groups. The huge structural diversity found in lipids arises from the biosynthesis of various combinations of these building blocks. For example, glycerophospholipids are composed of a glycerol backbone linked to one of approximately 10 possible headgroups and also to 2 fatty acyl/alkyl chains, which in turn may have 30 or more different molecular structures. In practice, not all possible permutations are detected experimentally, due to chain preferences depending on the cell type and also to detection limits - nevertheless several hundred distinct glycerophospholipid molecular species have been detected in mammalian cells.

Plant chloroplast thylakoid membranes however, have unique lipid composition as they are deficient in phospholipids. Also, their largest constituent, monogalactosyl diglyceride or MGDG, does not form aqueous bilayers. Nevertheless, dynamic studies reveal a normal lipid bilayer organisation in thylakoid membranes.

== Experimental techniques ==
=== Lipid extraction ===
Most methods of lipid extraction and isolation from biological samples exploit the high solubility of hydrocarbon chains in organic solvents. Given the diversity in lipid classes, it is not possible to accommodate all classes with a common extraction method. The traditional Bligh/Dyer procedure uses chloroform/methanol-based protocols that include phase partitioning into the organic layer. However, several protocols now exist, with newer methods overcoming the shortcomings of older ones and solving problems associated with, for example, targeted lipid isolation or high throughput data collection . Most protocols work relatively well for a variety of physiologically relevant lipids but they have to be adapted for species with particular properties and low-abundance and labile lipid metabolites .

=== Lipid separation ===
The simplest method of lipid separation is the use of thin layer chromatography (TLC). Although not as sensitive as other methods of lipid detection, it offers a rapid and comprehensive screening tool prior to more sensitive and sophisticated techniques. Solid-phase extraction (SPE) chromatography is useful for rapid, preparative separation of crude lipid mixtures into different lipid classes. This involves the use of prepacked columns containing silica or other stationary phases to separate glycerophospholipids, fatty acids, cholesteryl esters, glycerolipids, and sterols from crude lipid mixtures. High-performance liquid chromatography (HPLC or LC) is extensively used in lipidomic analysis to separate lipids prior to mass analysis. Separation can be achieved by either normal-phase (NP) HPLC or reverse-phase (RP) HPLC. For example, NP-HPLC effectively separates glycerophospholipids on the basis of headgroup polarity, whereas RP-HPLC effectively separates fatty acids such as eicosanoids on the basis of chain length, degree of unsaturation and substitution. For global, untargeted lipidomic studies it is common to use both RP and NP or Hydrophilic Interaction Liquid Chromatrography (HILC) columns for increased lipidome coverage. The application of nano-flow liquid chromatography (nLC) proved thereby to be most efficient to enhance both general measurement sensitivity and lipidome coverage for a global lipidomics approach. Chromatographic (HPLC/UHPLC) separation of lipids may either be performed offline or online where the eluate is integrated with the ionization source of a mass spectrometer.

=== Lipid detection ===
The progress of modern lipidomics has been greatly accelerated by the development of spectrometric methods in general and soft ionization techniques for mass spectrometry such as electrospray ionization (ESI), desorption electrospray ionization (DESI), and matrix-assisted laser desorption/ionization (MALDI) in particular. "Soft" ionization does not cause extensive fragmentation, so that comprehensive detection of an entire range of lipids within a complex mixture can be correlated to experimental conditions or disease state. In addition, the technique of atmospheric pressure chemical ionization (APCI) has become increasingly popular for the analysis of nonpolar lipids.

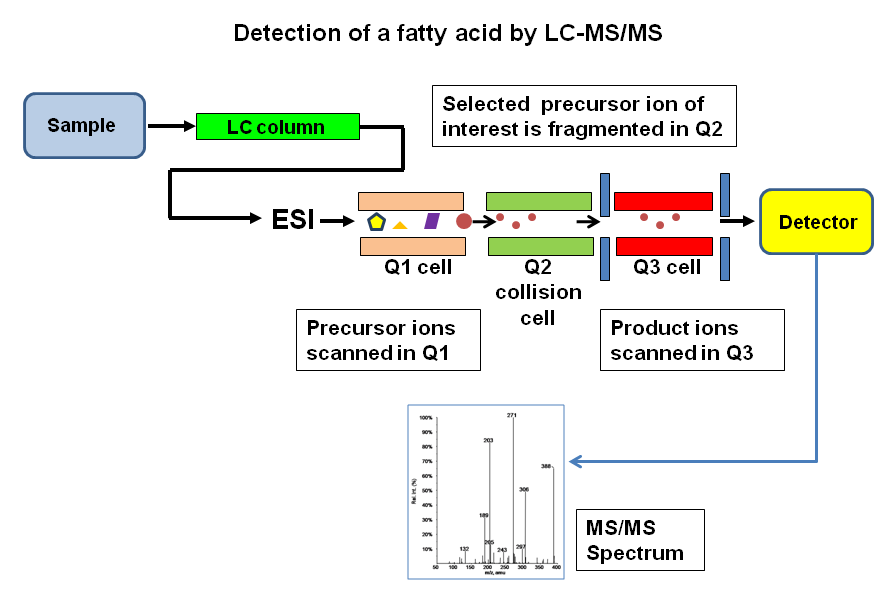
Schema showing detection of a fatty acid by LC-MS/MS using a linear ion-trap instrument and an electrospray (ESI) ion source.

==== ESI MS ====
ESI-MS was initially developed by Fenn and colleagues for analysis of biomolecules. It depends on the formation of gaseous ions from polar, thermally labile and mostly non-volatile molecules and thus is completely suitable for a variety of lipids. It is a soft-ionization method that rarely disrupts the chemical nature of the analyte prior to mass analysis. Various ESI-MS methods have been developed for analysis of different classes, subclasses, and individual lipid species from biological extracts. Comprehensive reviews of the methods and their application have recently been published. The major advantages of ESI-MS are high accuracy, sensitivity, reproducibility, and the applicability of the technique to complex solutions without prior derivatization. Han and coworkers have developed a method known as"shotgun lipidomics" which involves direct infusion of a crude lipid extract into an ESI source optimized for intrasource separation of lipids based on their intrinsic electrical properties.

==== DESI MS ====
DESI mass spectrometry is an ambient ionization technique developed by Professor Zoltan Takáts, et al., in Professor Graham Cooks' group from Purdue University. It combines the ESI and desorption ionization techniques, by directing an electrically charged mist to the sample surface that is a few millimeters away. The technique has been successfully applied to lipidomics as imaging tool to map the lipid distributions within tissue specimens. One of the advantages of DESI MS is that no matrix is required for tissue preparation, allowing multiple consecutive measurements on the same tissue specimen. DESI MS can also be used for imaging of lipids from tissue sections.

==== MALDI MS ====
MALDI mass spectrometry is a laser-based soft-ionization method often used for analysis of large proteins, but has been used successfully for lipids. The lipid is mixed with a matrix, such as 2,5-dihydroxybenzoic acid, and applied to a sample holder as a small spot. A laser is fired at the spot, and the matrix absorbs the energy, which is then transferred to the analyte, resulting in ionization of the molecule. MALDI-Time-of-flight (MALDI-TOF) MS has become a very promising approach for lipidomics studies, particularly for the imaging of lipids from tissue slides.

==== APCI MS ====
The source for APCI is similar to ESI except that ions are formed by the interaction of the heated analyte solvent with a corona discharge needle set at a high electrical potential. Primary ions are formed immediately surrounding the needle, and these interact with the solvent to form secondary ions that ultimately ionize the sample. APCI is particularly useful for the analysis of nonpolar lipids such as triacylglycerols, sterols, and fatty acid esters.

== Imaging techniques ==
The high sensitivity of DESI in the lipid range makes it a powerful technique for the detection and mapping of lipids abundances within tissue specimens. Recent developments in MALDI methods have enabled direct detection of lipids in-situ. Abundant lipid-related ions are produced from the direct analysis of thin tissue slices when sequential spectra are acquired across a tissue surface that has been coated with a MALDI matrix. Collisional activation of the molecular ions can be used to determine the lipid family and often structurally define the molecular species. These techniques enable detection of phospholipids, sphingolipids and glycerolipids in tissues such as heart, kidney and brain. Furthermore, distribution of many different lipid molecular species often define anatomical regions within these tissues.

== Lipid profiling ==
Quantitative lipid profiles (lipidomes) of yeast Saccharomyces cerevisiae grown in different temperatures

Lipid profiling is a targeted metabolomics platform that provides a comprehensive analysis of lipid species within a cell or tissue. Profiling based on electrospray ionization tandem mass spectrometry (ESI-MS/MS) is capable of providing quantitative data and is adaptable to high throughput analyses. The powerful approach of transgenics, namely deletion and/or overexpression of a gene product coupled with lipidomics, can give valuable insights into the role of biochemical pathways. Lipid profiling techniques have also been applied to plants and microorganisms such as yeast. A combination of quantitative lipidomic data in conjunction with the corresponding transcriptional data (using gene-array methods) and proteomic data (using tandem MS) enables a systems biology approach to a more in-depth understanding of the metabolic or signaling pathways of interest.

== Informatics ==
A major challenge for lipidomics, in particular for MS-based approaches, lies in the computational and bioinformatic demands of handling the large amount of data that arise at various stages along the chain of information acquisition and processing. Chromatographic and MS data collection requires substantial efforts in spectral alignment and statistical evaluation of fluctuations in signal intensities. Such variations have a multitude of origins, including biological variations, sample handling and analytical accuracy. As a consequence several replicates are normally required for reliable determination of lipid levels in complex mixtures. Within the last few years, a number of software packages have been developed by various companies and research groups to analyze data generated by MS profiling of metabolites, including lipids. The data processing for differential profiling usually proceed through several stages, including input file manipulation, spectral filtering, peak detection, chromatographic alignment, normalization, visualization, and data export. An example of metabolic profiling software is the freely-available Java-based Mzmine application. Another is Metabolon, Inc's commercial applications for metabolomic analysis using proprietary software. Recently MS-DIAL 4 software was integrated with a comprehensive lipidome atlas with retention time, collision cross-section and tandem mass spectrometry information for 117 lipid subclasses and 8,051 lipids. Some software packages such as Markerview include multivariate statistical analysis (for example, principal component analysis) and these will be helpful for the identification of correlations in lipid metabolites that are associated with a physiological phenotype, in particular for the development of lipid-based biomarkers. Another objective of the information technology side of lipidomics involves the construction of metabolic maps from data on lipid structures and lipid-related protein and genes. Some of these lipid pathways are extremely complex, for example the mammalian glycosphingolipid pathway. The establishment of searchable and interactive databases of lipids and lipid-related genes/proteins is also an extremely important resource as a reference for the lipidomics community. Integration of these databases with MS and other experimental data, as well as with metabolic networks offers an opportunity to devise therapeutic strategies to prevent or reverse these pathological states involving dysfunction of lipid-related processes.

== See also ==
- Lipid
- Lipidome
