= ORFeome =

In molecular genetics, an ORFeome refers to the complete set of open reading frames (ORFs) in a genome. The term may also be used to describe a set of cloned ORFs. ORFs correspond to the protein coding sequences (CDS) of genes. ORFs can be found in genome sequences by computer programs such as GENSCAN and then amplified by PCR. While this is relatively trivial in bacteria the problem is non-trivial in eukaryotic genomes because of the presence of introns and exons as well as splice variants.

== Use in research ==
The usage of complete ORFeomes reflects a new trend in biology that can be succinctly summarized as omics. ORFeomes are used for the study of protein-protein interactions, protein microarrays, the study of antigens, and other fields of study.

== Cloned ORFeomes ==
Complete ORF sets have been cloned for a number of organisms including Brucella melitensis, Chlamydia pneumoniae, Escherichia coli, Neisseria gonorrhoeae,

Pseudomonas aeruginosa, Schizosaccharomyces pombe,

Staphylococcus aureus

and human herpesviruses

A partial human ORFeome has also been produced.
