= Ionomics =

Ionomics is the measurement of the total elemental composition of an organism to address biological problems. Questions within physiology, ecology, evolution, and many other fields can be investigated using ionomics, often coupled with bioinformatics, chemometrics and other genetic tools. Observing an organism's ionome is a powerful approach to the functional analysis of its genes and the gene networks. Information about the physiological state of an organism can also be revealed indirectly through its ionome, for example iron deficiency in a plant can be identified by looking at a number of other elements, rather than iron itself. A more typical example is in a blood test, where a number of conditions involving nutrition or disease may be inferred from testing this single tissue for sodium, potassium, iron, chlorine, zinc, magnesium, calcium and copper.

In practice, the total elemental composition of an organism is rarely determined. The number and type of elements measured are limited by the available instrumentation, the assumed value of the element in question, and the added cost of measuring each additional element. Also, a single tissue may be measured instead of the entire organism, as in the example given above of a blood test, or in the case of plants, the sampling of just the leaves or seeds. These are simply issues of practicality.

Various techniques may be fruitfully used to measure elemental composition. Among the best are Inductively-Coupled Plasma Optical Emission Spectroscopy (ICP-OES), Inductively-Coupled Plasma Mass Spectrometry (ICP-MS), X-Ray Fluorescence (XRF), synchrotron-based microXRF, and Neutron activation analysis (NAA). This latter technique has been applied to perform ionomics in the study of breast cancer, colorectal cancer and brain cancer. High-throughput ionomic phenotyping has created the need for data management systems to collect, organize and share the collected data with researchers worldwide.
