= Charles Musès =

American mathematician, cyberneticist, editor

Charles Arthur Muses (/ˈmʌsɪs/; 28 April 1919 – 26 August 2000), was a mathematician, cyberneticist and esoteric philosopher who wrote articles and books under various pseudonyms (including Musès, Musaios, Kyril Demys, Arthur Fontaine, Kenneth Demarest and Carl von Balmadis). He founded the Lion Path, a shamanistic movement. His views relating to mathematics, physics, philosophy, and many other fields are considered visionary by some scholars while being controversial to others.

== Early life and education ==
Muses was born in Jersey City, New Jersey, and grew up in Long Island, New York. His father abandoned the family when Muses was a young boy. Muses mother supported him and their large extended family on a school teacher's salary. Years later he would remark in lectures that if his mother had not had an overarching faith in his abilities he might never have been able to escape the confines of his impoverished youth.

In 1938, Muses earned a BSc from the City University of New York, majoring in mathematics and chemistry. In 1947, he completed his Master's Degree in philosophy at Columbia University, followed by a PhD in 1951 for his thesis on symbolic logic.

== Career ==
Musès chaired the first International Conference on Bio-Simulation, held in Locarno in 1960 alongside Warren S. McCulloch and Ross Ashby. The conference proceedings appeared in 1962 as Aspects of the Theory of Artificial Intelligence, with a second edition following in 1966 from Plenum Press, New York.

In 1962, under NATO sponsorship, he co-taught with Norbert Wiener at the School of Theoretical Physics at the University of Naples. Two years later, following Wiener's fatal accident in Sweden, Italy's National Research Council commissioned Musès to write Wiener's official obituary and to edit his posthumously published paper, "The History and Prehistory of Cybernetics." In 1970, NASA invited him to deliver a lecture on "Hypernumbers: Properties and Applications."

Over the course of his career, Musès held a number of positions, several of them honorary. From 1965 until his death he served as Director of the Mathematics & Morphology Research Centre in Switzerland, an institute that maintained editorial and research offices in both the United States and Canada. He was Assistant Editor of Kybernetes: The International Journal of Systems and Cybernetics from 1970 to 1981 under editor J. Rose, becoming its Foundations Editor in 1982; after the journal moved to MCB University Press, he joined its Editorial Advisory Board. He also served as an Editorial Advisor to the International Journal of Biomedical Computing from 1970 until 2000, and sat on the Series Advisory Board of Frontiers in Systems Science from 1975 to 1985.

== Philosophical work ==
=== Freher and Bohme ===
In 1949, Muses submitted for approval his Columbia University Ph.D work in philosophy (see preface to the dissertation). The doctoral thesis led with the name of a German-English exegete, Dionysius Andreas Freher (d. 1728), who through years of study had learned about the far-famed German Jacob Böhme (d. 1624), the latter being the actual subject of Muses's pre-doctoral studies at Columbia. This was suggested by and confirmed in the subtitle of the thesis, 'An Inquiry in the Work of A Fundamental Contributor to the Philosophic Tradition of Jacob Boehme.' With some modifications (seen by comparing the thesis to the subsequent book), the entirety was published in 1951 under the title 'Illumination on Jacob Boehme: The Work of Dionysius Andreas Freher' by King’s Crown Press. On pp. 151-2 Muses states, “Both Boehme’s and Freher’s outstanding message philosophically is that philosophy is not a dodge, game, or only some kind of artistic exercise, but a solid enterprise of most productive value – able to yield concrete results of a most extended nature in terms of deep changes in attitude and understanding, leading to actions toward and realization of the intrinsic nobility possible to and desired by mankind.” There was two-year delay between finishing the thesis work (1949) and its recognition in the grant of the Ph.D. (1951).

=== Religious studies ===
In 1991, the book In All Her Names: Explorations of the Feminine in Divinity was published by Harper San Francisco. It was edited by Joseph Campbell and Charles Muses. Each contributed a chapter to the book along with Riane Eisler and Marija Gimbutas. The title of Muses chapter is "The Ageless Way of Goddess: Divine Pregnancy and Higher Birth in Ancient Egypt and China". On pages 136–137, he states, “Similarly, the ancient theurgic doctrine taught that in the dim and mysterious recesses of each human brain are lodged the control centers for transducing a higher metamorphic process in that individual, of which the butterfly, wonderful as it is, is but a crude and imperfect analogue... The acquisition of a higher body by an individual meant also, by that very token, the possibility of communicating with beings already so endowed. The entrance into this higher community and fellowship is one of the principal causes for celebration in the Ancient Egyptian liturgy of the sacred transformative process – sacred because it conferred so much beyond ordinary life.”

Charles Muses edited, Esoteric Teachings of the Tibetan Tantra, which was translated into English by Chang Chen Chi. The book was first published in 1961, by The Falcon’s Wing Press. Muses states on page ix of the introduction, “In these considerations also lies the true meaning of the most secret tantric path, in Tibet called the Vajrayana or Thunderbolt Vehicle. It is a secret only because most do not have enough intelligent love-will to find and pursue it. For those who place such a level of high desire first, however, the precious means (upaya) will mysteriously arise in their lifetimes, and they will be able to tread this path of Love-Will-Wisdom, of Heart, Hand and Head harmoniously joined. But heart or love must rule the other two or wisdom will become unwise and love-will deteriorate again into self-will.”

Muses chose to not become a faculty member at an institution of higher learning because he felt it would limit his ability to write and publish in a wide range of disciplines. Muses wrote, lectured, traveled widely during his life, and resided in the United States, France, and Canada.

=== Chronotopology ===
In 1985, Kluwer-Nijhoff first published Muses' book entitled Destiny and Control in Human Systems. In it he proposes a method called ‘chronotopology,’ which he argued can measure the qualitative multidimensional structure of time. In chapter 5, entitled “Fonts Et Origo: Some Traditions Uniquely Illuminating the Structure and Meaning of Time Systems,” Muses provides historical sources for his claim, “That the nature of time is inextricably bound up with the origins of evil...” (p. 128). On page 138, he states, “Thus our world of waiting, disease, aging, suffering, and death stems from the nature of time itself and was part and parcel of the set of implied consequences of the Demuiurge’s Dream – that very brief nightmare that had spawned a reality of evil on awakening.” And Muses states on page 139 that “... the God of our universe is a wounded God in heart although Himself recovered. His domain, which before was a universally symbiotic cosmos, had now become the frenetically struggling, predominantly predatory one we all know, with Nature trying still to smile through her travail. There is a mysterious tradition both in Iran and Egypt of the female aspect of this Divinity (Daena in Iran and Isis in Egypt) who did not share the death-dream of her spouse and who in fact helped him revive as the renewed and victorious Horus.”

== Mathematical work ==
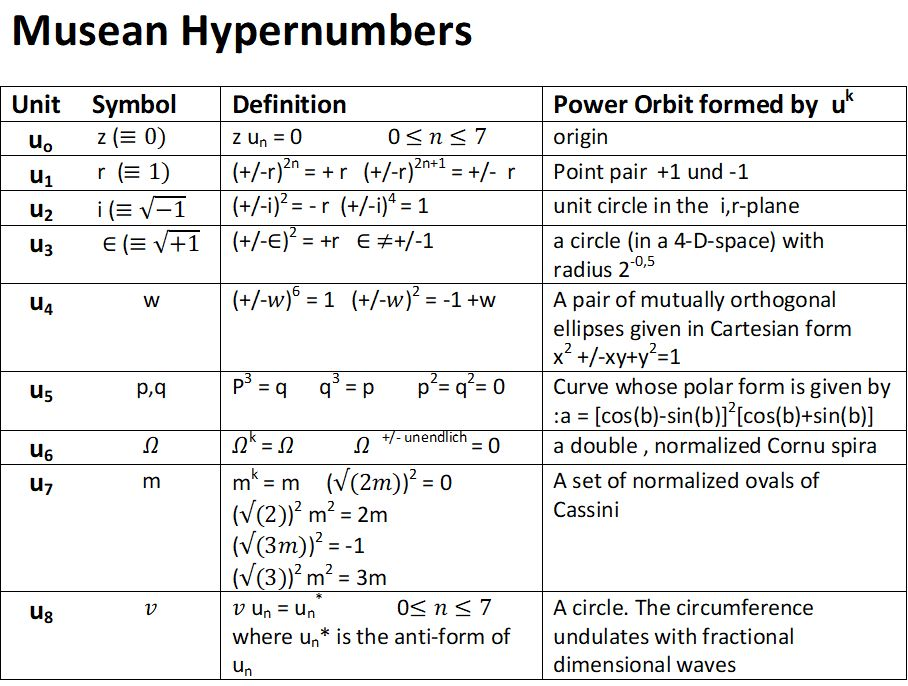
Musean Hypernumbers, table by Klaus Scharff

Muses envisioned a mathematical number concept, Musean hypernumbers, that includes hypercomplex number algebras such as complex numbers and split-complex numbers as primitive types. He assigned them levels based on certain arithmetical properties they may possess. While many open questions remain, in particular about defining the relations of these levels, Muses pictured a wide range of applicability for this concept. Some of these are based on the properties of magic squares, and even related to religious belief. He believed that these hypernumbers were central to issues of consciousness.

Some research work about hypernumbers was done by the mathematicians Jens Koeplinger and John A. Shuster.

== Legal troubles ==
Muses was arrested in Egypt on June 20, 1957, and charged with attempting to smuggle antiquities aboard. In August of 1957, Muses pleaded guilty to the charge in order to escape the harsh conditions of his imprisonment, and was released the same month through the efforts of the US Department of State. After returning to the United States Muses claimed that he had been falsely accused by the Egyptian secret police in retribution for attempting to stop their persecution of the daughter of a prominent Egyptian family.

== Selected writings ==
- 1951: Illumination on Jacob Boehme. The work of Dionysius Andreas Freher, King's Crown Press, New York
- 1953: An Evaluation of Relativity Theory after a Half-century, S. Weiser, New York, link via Internet Archive
- 1955: East-West fire. Schopenhauer's optimism and the Lankavatara sutra. An excursion toward the common ground between Oriental and Western religion, Watkins, London
- 1962: (editor) The Logic of Biosimulation: Aspects of the Theory of Artificial Intelligence: Proceedings of the First International Symposium on Biosimulation, Locarno, June 27 to July 5. 1960, Plenum, New York pages 115–163.
- 1965: "Systematic stability and cybernetic control. An introduction to the cybernetics of higher integrated behavior", Rome
- 1965: "Aspects of Some Crucial Problems in Biological and Medical Bio-Cybernetics", Band II, Elsevier, Norbert Wiener & J. P. Schade editors, Amsterdam
- 1966: "The First Nondistributive Algebra, with Relations to Optimization and Control Theory", in: E. R. Caianiello: Functional Analysis and Optimization, Academic Press, New York/ London, pages 171–212.
- 1967: "Hypernumber", Annals of the New York Academy of Sciences 138, New York, pages 660, 901.
- 1972: (with Arthur M. Young) Consciousness and Reality. The human pivot point, Outerbridge & Lazard, New Cork
- 1985: Destiny and control in human systems, Studies in the interactive connectedness of time (chronotopology) (= Frontiers in systems research.). Kluwer-Nijhoff, Dordrecht/ Boston, ISBN 0-89838-156-8.
- 1991: "The Ageless Way of Goddess: Divine Pregnancy and Higher Birth in Ancient Egypt and China", in: Joseph Campbell, Charles Musès (editors) In All Her Names. Explorations of the feminine in divinity, Harper, San Francisco ISBN 0-06-250629-3, pages 131–164.
- 1996: The Lionpath - The Big Picture: A Short Path to Regeneration for our time, Musaios. fifth printing, House of Horus, Sardis (B.C. Canada)
- 1999: The Shamanic Lionpath, House of Horus, Musaios, Sardis (B.C. Canada)

== See also ==
- Pyramid of Ameny Qemau – pyramid he discovered in 1957
