= HitPredict =

Database of protein-protein interactions

Content
- Description: quality assessed protein-protein interactions in nine species.

Contact
- Research center: The University of Tokyo
- Laboratory: Human Genome Center, The Institute of Medical Science
- Authors: Ashwini Patil
- Primary citation: Patil & al. (2011)
- Release date: 2010

Access
- Website: http://hintdb.hgc.jp/htp/

HitPredict is a database of high confidence protein-protein interactions.

== See also ==
- Protein-protein interaction
- BioGRID
