= Protein–protein interaction =

Physical interactions and constructions between multiple proteins

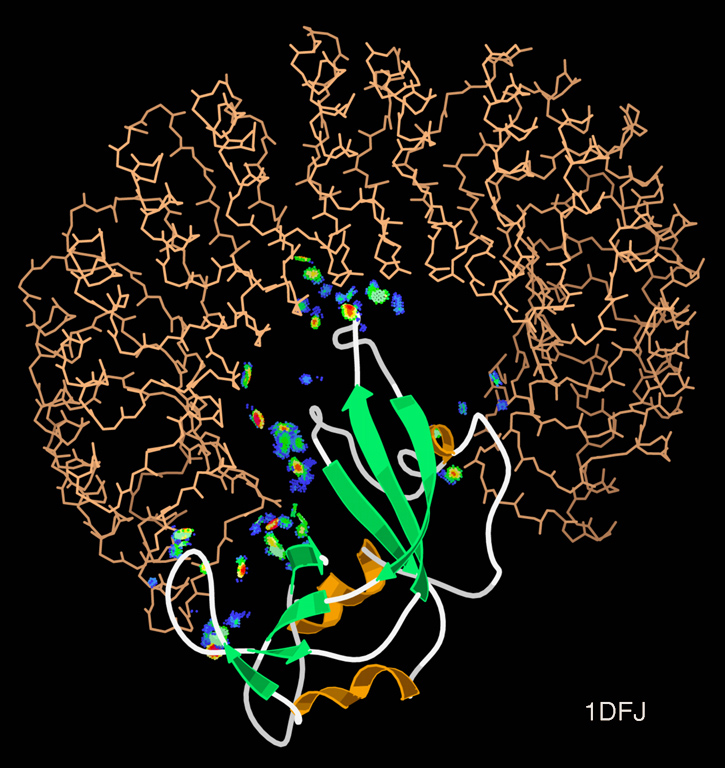
The horseshoe shaped ribonuclease inhibitor (shown as wireframe) forms a protein–protein interaction with the ribonuclease protein. The contacts between the two proteins are shown as coloured patches.

Protein–protein interactions (PPIs) are physical contacts of high specificity established between two or more protein molecules as a result of biochemical events steered by interactions that include electrostatic forces, hydrogen bonding and the hydrophobic effect. Many are physical contacts with molecular associations between chains that occur in a cell or in a living organism in a specific biomolecular context.

Proteins rarely act alone as their functions tend to be regulated. Many molecular processes within a cell are carried out by molecular machines that are built from numerous protein components organized by their PPIs. These physiological interactions make up the so-called interactomics of the organism, while aberrant PPIs are the basis of multiple aggregation-related diseases, such as Creutzfeldt–Jakob and Alzheimer's diseases.

PPIs have been studied with many methods and from different perspectives: biochemistry, quantum chemistry, molecular dynamics, signal transduction, among others. All this information enables the creation of large protein interaction networks – similar to metabolic or genetic/epigenetic networks – that empower the current knowledge on biochemical cascades and molecular etiology of disease, as well as the discovery of putative protein targets of therapeutic interest.

== Examples ==
=== Electron transfer proteins ===
In many metabolic reactions, a protein that acts as an electron carrier binds to an enzyme that acts as its reductase. After it receives an electron, it dissociates and then binds to the next enzyme that acts as its oxidase (i.e. an acceptor of the electron). These interactions between proteins are dependent on highly specific binding between proteins to ensure efficient electron transfer. Examples: mitochondrial oxidative phosphorylation chain system components cytochrome c-reductase / cytochrome c / cytochrome c oxidase; microsomal and mitochondrial P450 systems.

In the case of the mitochondrial P450 systems, the specific residues involved in the binding of the electron transfer protein adrenodoxin to its reductase were identified as two basic Arg residues on the surface of the reductase and two acidic Asp residues on the adrenodoxin. More recent work on the phylogeny of the reductase has shown that these residues involved in protein–protein interactions have been conserved throughout the evolution of this enzyme.

=== Signal transduction ===
The activity of the cell is regulated by extracellular signals. Signal propagation inside and/or along the interior of cells depends on PPIs between the various signaling molecules. The recruitment of signaling pathways through PPIs is called signal transduction and plays a fundamental role in many biological processes and in many diseases including Parkinson's disease and cancer.

=== Membrane transport ===
A protein may be carrying another protein (for example, from cytoplasm to nucleus or vice versa in the case of the nuclear pore importins).

=== Cell metabolism ===
In many biosynthetic processes enzymes interact with each other to produce small compounds or other macromolecules.

=== Muscle contraction ===
Physiology of muscle contraction involves several interactions. Myosin filaments act as molecular motors and by binding to actin enables filament sliding. Furthermore, members of the skeletal muscle lipid droplet-associated proteins family associate with other proteins, as activator of adipose triglyceride lipase and its coactivator comparative gene identification-58, to regulate lipolysis in skeletal muscle

== Types ==
To describe the types of protein–protein interactions (PPIs), proteins can interact in a "transient" way (to produce some specific effect in a short time, like signal transduction) or to interact with other proteins in a "stable" way to form complexes that become molecular machines within the living systems. A protein complex assembly can result in the formation of homo-oligomeric or hetero-oligomeric complexes. In addition to the conventional complexes, as enzyme-inhibitor and antibody-antigen, interactions can also be established between domain-domain and domain-peptide. Another important distinction to identify protein–protein interactions is the way they have been determined, since there are techniques that measure direct physical interactions between protein pairs, named "binary" methods, while there are other techniques that measure physical interactions among groups of proteins, without pairwise determination of protein partners, named "co-complex" methods.

=== Homo-oligomers vs. hetero-oligomers ===
Homo-oligomers are macromolecular complexes constituted by only one type of protein subunit. Protein subunits assembly is guided by the establishment of non-covalent interactions in the quaternary structure of the protein. Disruption of homo-oligomers in order to return to the initial individual monomers often requires denaturation of the complex. Several enzymes, carrier proteins, scaffolding proteins, and transcriptional regulatory factors carry out their functions as homo-oligomers. Distinct protein subunits interact in hetero-oligomers, which are essential to control several cellular functions. The importance of the communication between heterologous proteins is even more evident during cell signaling events and such interactions are only possible due to structural domains within the proteins (as described below).

=== Stable interactions vs. transient interactions ===
Stable interactions involve proteins that interact for a long time, taking part of permanent complexes as subunits, in order to carry out functional roles. These are usually the case of homo-oligomers (e.g. cytochrome c), and some hetero-oligomeric proteins, as the subunits of ATPase. On the other hand, a protein may interact briefly and in a reversible manner with other proteins in only certain cellular contexts – cell type, cell cycle stage, external factors, presence of other binding proteins, etc. – as it happens with most of the proteins involved in biochemical cascades. These are called transient interactions. For example, some G protein–coupled receptors only transiently bind to G_{i/o} proteins when they are activated by extracellular ligands, while some G_{q}-coupled receptors, such as muscarinic receptor M3, pre-couple with G_{q} proteins prior to the receptor-ligand binding. Interactions between intrinsically disordered protein regions to globular protein domains (i.e. MoRFs) are transient interactions.

=== Covalent vs. non-covalent ===
Covalent interactions are those with the strongest association and are formed by disulphide bonds or electron sharing. While rare, these interactions are determinant in some posttranslational modifications, as ubiquitination and SUMOylation. Non-covalent bonds are usually established during transient interactions by the combination of weaker bonds, such as hydrogen bonds, ionic interactions, Van der Waals forces, or hydrophobic bonds.

=== Role of water ===
Water molecules play a significant role in the interactions between proteins. The crystal structures of complexes, obtained at high resolution from different but homologous proteins, have shown that some interface water molecules are conserved between homologous complexes. The majority of the interface water molecules make hydrogen bonds with both partners of each complex. Some interface amino acid residues or atomic groups of one protein partner engage in both direct and water mediated interactions with the other protein partner. Doubly indirect interactions, mediated by two water molecules, are more numerous in the homologous complexes of low affinity. Carefully conducted mutagenesis experiments, e.g. changing a tyrosine residue into a phenylalanine, have shown that water mediated interactions can contribute to the energy of interaction. Thus, water molecules may facilitate the interactions and cross-recognitions between proteins.

== Structure ==
The molecular structures of many protein complexes have been unlocked by the technique of X-ray crystallography. The first structure to be solved by this method was that of sperm whale myoglobin by Sir John Cowdery Kendrew. In this technique the angles and intensities of a beam of X-rays diffracted by crystalline atoms are detected in a film, thus producing a three-dimensional picture of the density of electrons within the crystal.

Later, nuclear magnetic resonance also started to be applied with the aim of unravelling the molecular structure of protein complexes. One of the first examples was the structure of calmodulin-binding domains bound to calmodulin. This technique is based on the study of magnetic properties of atomic nuclei, thus determining physical and chemical properties of the correspondent atoms or the molecules. Nuclear magnetic resonance is advantageous for characterizing weak PPIs.

=== Protein-protein interaction domains ===
Some proteins have specific structural domains or sequence motifs that provide binding to other proteins. Here are some examples of such domains:

- Src homology 2 (SH2) domain

SH2 domains are structurally composed by three-stranded twisted beta sheet sandwiched flanked by two alpha-helices. The existence of a deep binding pocket with high affinity for phosphotyrosine, but not for phosphoserine or phosphothreonine, is essential for the recognition of tyrosine phosphorylated proteins, mainly autophosphorylated growth factor receptors. Growth factor receptor binding proteins and phospholipase Cγ are examples of proteins that have SH2 domains.

- Src homology 3 (SH3) domain

Structurally, SH3 domains are constituted by a beta barrel formed by two orthogonal beta sheets and three anti-parallel beta strands. These domains recognize proline enriched sequences, as polyproline type II helical structure (PXXP motifs) in cell signaling proteins like protein tyrosine kinases and the growth factor receptor bound protein 2 (Grb2).

- Phosphotyrosine-binding (PTB) domain

PTB domains interact with sequences that contain a phosphotyrosine group. These domains can be found in the insulin receptor substrate.

- LIM domain

LIM domains were initially identified in three homeodomain transcription factors (lin11, is11, and mec3). In addition to this homeodomain proteins and other proteins involved in development, LIM domains have also been identified in non-homeodomain proteins with relevant roles in cellular differentiation, association with cytoskeleton and senescence. These domains contain a tandem cysteine-rich Zn^{2+}-finger motif and embrace the consensus sequence CX2CX16-23HX2CX2CX2CX16-21CX2C/H/D. LIM domains bind to PDZ domains, bHLH transcription factors, and other LIM domains.

- Sterile alpha motif (SAM) domain

SAM domains are composed by five helices forming a compact package with a conserved hydrophobic core. These domains, which can be found in the Eph receptor and the stromal interaction molecule (STIM) for example, bind to non-SAM domain-containing proteins and they also appear to have the ability to bind RNA.

- PDZ domain

PDZ domains were first identified in three guanylate kinases: PSD-95, DlgA and ZO-1. These domains recognize carboxy-terminal tri-peptide motifs (S/TXV), other PDZ domains or LIM domains and bind them through a short peptide sequence that has a C-terminal hydrophobic residue. Some of the proteins identified as having PDZ domains are scaffolding proteins or seem to be involved in ion receptor assembling and receptor-enzyme complexes formation.

- FERM domain

FERM domains contain basic residues capable of binding PtdIns(4,5)P_{2}. Talin and focal adhesion kinase (FAK) are two of the proteins that present FERM domains.

- Calponin homology (CH) domain

CH domains are mainly present in cytoskeletal proteins as parvin.

- Pleckstrin homology domain

Pleckstrin homology domains bind to phosphoinositides and acid domains in signaling proteins.

- WW domain

WW domains bind to proline enriched sequences.

- WSxWS motif

Found in cytokine receptors

== Properties of the interface ==
The study of the molecular structure can give fine details about the interface that enables the interaction between proteins. When characterizing PPI interfaces it is important to take into account the type of complex.

Parameters evaluated include size (measured in absolute dimensions Å^{2} or in solvent-accessible surface area (SASA)), shape, complementarity between surfaces, residue interface propensities, hydrophobicity, segmentation and secondary structure, and conformational changes on complex formation.

The great majority of PPI interfaces reflects the composition of protein surfaces, rather than the protein cores, in spite of being frequently enriched in hydrophobic residues, particularly in aromatic residues. PPI interfaces are dynamic and frequently planar, although they can be globular and protruding as well. Based on three structures – insulin dimer, trypsin-pancreatic trypsin inhibitor complex, and oxyhaemoglobin – Cyrus Chothia and Joel Janin found that between 1,130 and 1,720 Å^{2} of surface area was removed from contact with water indicating that hydrophobicity is a major factor of stabilization of PPIs. Later studies refined the buried surface area of the majority of interactions to 1,600±350 Å^{2}. However, much larger interaction interfaces were also observed and were associated with significant changes in conformation of one of the interaction partners. PPIs interfaces exhibit both shape and electrostatic complementarity.

== Regulation ==
- Protein concentration, which in turn are affected by expression levels and degradation rates;
- Protein affinity for proteins or other binding ligands;
- Ligands concentrations (substrates, ions, etc.);
- Presence of other proteins, nucleic acids, and ions;
- Electric fields around proteins.
- Occurrence of covalent modifications;

== Experimental methods ==
There are a multitude of methods to detect them. Each of the approaches has its own strengths and weaknesses, especially with regard to the sensitivity and specificity of the method. The most conventional and widely used high-throughput methods are yeast two-hybrid screening and affinity purification coupled to mass spectrometry.

Principles of yeast and mammalian two-hybrid systems

=== Yeast two-hybrid screening ===
This system was firstly described in 1989 by Fields and Song using Saccharomyces cerevisiae as biological model. Yeast two hybrid allows the identification of pairwise PPIs (binary method) in vivo, in which the two proteins are tested for biophysically direct interaction. The Y2H is based on the functional reconstitution of the yeast transcription factor Gal4 and subsequent activation of a selective reporter such as His3. To test two proteins for interaction, two protein expression constructs are made: one protein (X) is fused to the Gal4 DNA-binding domain (DB) and a second protein (Y) is fused to the Gal4 activation domain (AD). In the assay, yeast cells are transformed with these constructs. Transcription of reporter genes does not occur unless bait (DB-X) and prey (AD-Y) interact with each other and form a functional Gal4 transcription factor. Thus, the interaction between proteins can be inferred by the presence of the products resultant of the reporter gene expression. In cases in which the reporter gene expresses enzymes that allow the yeast to synthesize essential amino acids or nucleotides, yeast growth under selective media conditions indicates that the two proteins tested are interacting. Recently, software to detect and prioritize protein interactions was published.

Despite its usefulness, the yeast two-hybrid system has limitations. It uses yeast as main host system, which can be a problem when studying proteins that contain mammalian-specific post-translational modifications. The number of PPIs identified is usually low because of a high false negative rate; and, understates membrane proteins, for example.

During his studies, Molecular biologist Anton Yuryev used yeast two-hybrid screening to identify novel protein interactions linking transcription with post‑transcriptional modification, demonstrating the utility of these methods for revealing functional, isoform‑specific PPIs. In initial studies that utilized Y2H, proper controls for false positives (e.g. when DB-X activates the reporter gene without the presence of AD-Y) were frequently not done, leading to a higher than normal false positive rate. An empirical framework must be implemented to control for these false positives. Limitations in lower coverage of membrane proteins have been overcoming by the emergence of yeast two-hybrid variants, such as the membrane yeast two-hybrid (MYTH) and the split-ubiquitin system, which are not limited to interactions that occur in the nucleus; and, the bacterial two-hybrid system, performed in bacteria;

Principle of tandem affinity purification

=== Affinity purification coupled to mass spectrometry ===
Affinity purification coupled to mass spectrometry mostly detects stable interactions and thus better indicates functional in vivo PPIs. This method starts by purification of the tagged protein, which is expressed in the cell usually at in vivo concentrations, and its interacting proteins (affinity purification). One of the most advantageous and widely used methods to purify proteins with very low contaminating background is the tandem affinity purification, developed by Bertrand Seraphin and Matthias Mann and respective colleagues. PPIs can then be analysed by mass spectrometry using different methods: chemical incorporation, biological or metabolic incorporation (SILAC), and label-free methods. Furthermore, network theory has been used to study the whole set of identified protein–protein interactions in cells.

=== Nucleic acid programmable protein array (NAPPA) ===
This system was first developed by LaBaer and colleagues in 2004 by using in vitro transcription and translation system. They use DNA template encoding the gene of interest fused with GST protein, and it was immobilized in the solid surface. Anti-GST antibody and biotinylated plasmid DNA were bounded in aminopropyltriethoxysilane (APTES)-coated slide. BSA can improve the binding efficiency of DNA. Biotinylated plasmid DNA was bound by avidin. New protein was synthesized by using cell-free expression system i.e. rabbit reticulocyte lysate (RRL), and then the new protein was captured through anti-GST antibody bounded on the slide. To test protein–protein interaction, the targeted protein cDNA and query protein cDNA were immobilized in a same coated slide. By using in vitro transcription and translation system, targeted and query protein was synthesized by the same extract. The targeted protein was bound to array by antibody coated in the slide and query protein was used to probe the array. The query protein was tagged with hemagglutinin (HA) epitope. Thus, the interaction between the two proteins was visualized with the antibody against HA.

=== Intragenic complementation ===
When multiple copies of a polypeptide encoded by a gene form a complex, this protein structure is referred to as a multimer. When a multimer is formed from polypeptides produced by two different mutant alleles of a particular gene, the mixed multimer may exhibit greater functional activity than the unmixed multimers formed by each of the mutants alone. In such a case, the phenomenon is referred to as intragenic complementation (also called inter-allelic complementation). Intragenic complementation has been demonstrated in many different genes in a variety of organisms including the fungi Neurospora crassa, Saccharomyces cerevisiae and Schizosaccharomyces pombe; the bacterium Salmonella typhimurium; the virus bacteriophage T4, an RNA virus and humans. In such studies, numerous mutations defective in the same gene were often isolated and mapped in a linear order on the basis of recombination frequencies to form a genetic map of the gene. Separately, the mutants were tested in pairwise combinations to measure complementation. An analysis of the results from such studies led to the conclusion that intragenic complementation, in general, arises from the interaction of differently defective polypeptide monomers to form a multimer. Genes that encode multimer-forming polypeptides appear to be common. One interpretation of the data is that polypeptide monomers are often aligned in the multimer in such a way that mutant polypeptides defective at nearby sites in the genetic map tend to form a mixed multimer that functions poorly, whereas mutant polypeptides defective at distant sites tend to form a mixed multimer that functions more effectively. Direct interaction of two nascent proteins emerging from nearby ribosomes appears to be a general mechanism for homo-oligomer (multimer) formation. Hundreds of protein oligomers were identified that assemble in human cells by such an interaction. The most prevalent form of interaction is between the N-terminal regions of the interacting proteins. Dimer formation appears to be able to occur independently of dedicated assembly machines. The intermolecular forces likely responsible for self-recognition and multimer formation were discussed by Jehle.

=== Other potential methods ===
Diverse techniques to identify PPIs have been emerging along with technology progression. These include co-immunoprecipitation, protein microarrays, analytical ultracentrifugation, light scattering, fluorescence spectroscopy, luminescence-based mammalian interactome mapping (LUMIER), resonance-energy transfer systems, mammalian protein–protein interaction trap, electro-switchable biosurfaces, protein–fragment complementation assay, as well as real-time label-free measurements by surface plasmon resonance, and calorimetry.

== Computational methods ==
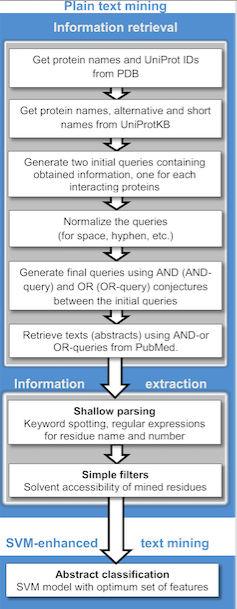
Text mining protocol.

=== Computational prediction of protein–protein interactions ===
The experimental detection and characterization of PPIs is labor-intensive and time-consuming. However, many PPIs can be also predicted computationally, usually using experimental data as a starting point. However, methods have also been developed that allow the prediction of PPI de novo, that is without prior evidence for these interactions.

==== Genomic context methods ====
The Rosetta Stone or Domain Fusion method is based on the hypothesis that interacting proteins are sometimes fused into a single protein in another genome. Therefore, we can predict if two proteins may be interacting by determining if they each have non-overlapping sequence similarity to a region of a single protein sequence in another genome.

The Conserved Neighborhood method is based on the hypothesis that if genes encoding two proteins are neighbors on a chromosome in many genomes, then they are likely functionally related (and possibly physically interacting).

The Phylogenetic Profile method is based on the hypothesis that if two or more proteins are concurrently present or absent across several genomes, then they are likely functionally related. Therefore, potentially interacting proteins can be identified by determining the presence or absence of genes across many genomes and selecting those genes which are always present or absent together.

=== Text mining methods ===
Publicly available information from biomedical documents is readily accessible through the internet and is becoming a powerful resource for collecting known protein–protein interactions (PPIs), PPI prediction and protein docking. Text mining is much less costly and time-consuming compared to other high-throughput techniques. Currently, text mining methods generally detect binary relations between interacting proteins from individual sentences using rule/pattern-based information extraction and machine learning approaches. A wide variety of text mining applications for PPI extraction and/or prediction are available for public use, as well as repositories which often store manually validated and/or computationally predicted PPIs. Text mining can be implemented in two stages: information retrieval, where texts containing names of either or both interacting proteins are retrieved and information extraction, where targeted information (interacting proteins, implicated residues, interaction types, etc.) is extracted.

There are also studies using phylogenetic profiling, basing their functionalities on the theory that proteins involved in common pathways co-evolve in a correlated fashion across species. Some more complex text mining methodologies use advanced Natural Language Processing (NLP) techniques and build knowledge networks (for example, considering gene names as nodes and verbs as edges). Other developments involve kernel methods to predict protein interactions.

=== Machine learning methods ===
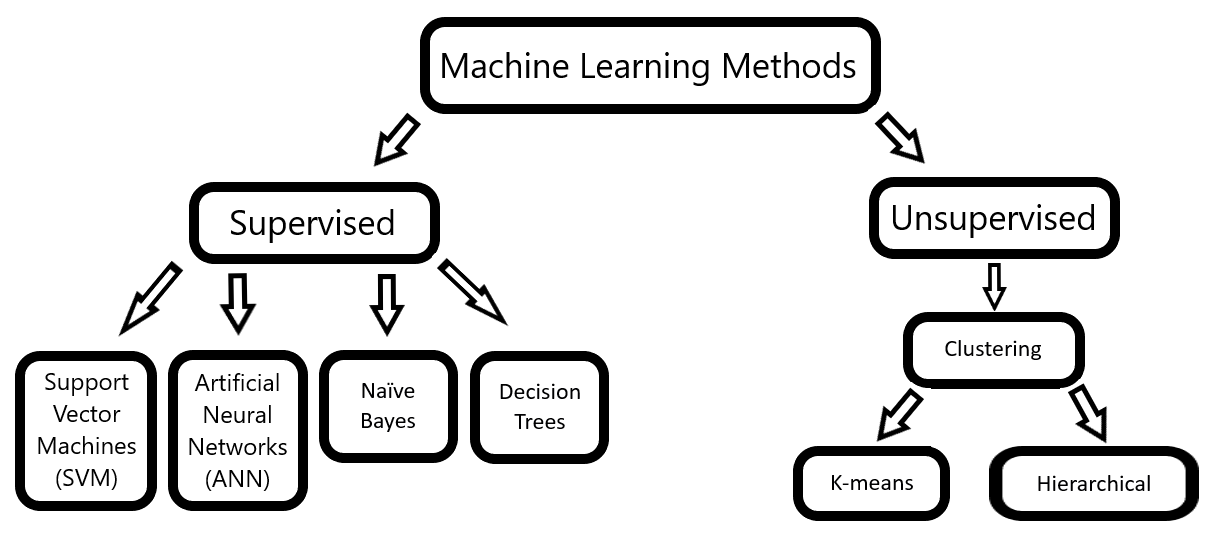
Machine-learning technique classification hierarchy.

Many computational methods have been suggested and reviewed for predicting protein–protein interactions. Prediction approaches can be grouped into categories based on predictive evidence: protein sequence, comparative genomics, protein domains, protein tertiary structure, and interaction network topology. The construction of a positive set (known interacting protein pairs) and a negative set (non-interacting protein pairs) is needed for the development of a computational prediction model. Prediction models using machine learning techniques can be broadly classified into two main groups: supervised and unsupervised, based on the labeling of input variables according to the expected outcome.

In 2005, integral membrane proteins of Saccharomyces cerevisiae were analyzed using the mating-based ubiquitin system (mbSUS). The system detects membrane proteins interactions with extracellular signaling proteins Of the 705 integral membrane proteins 1,985 different interactions were traced that involved 536 proteins. To sort and classify interactions a support vector machine was used to define high medium and low confidence interactions. The split-ubiquitin membrane yeast two-hybrid system uses transcriptional reporters to identify yeast transformants that encode pairs of interacting proteins. In 2006, random forest, an example of a supervised technique, was found to be the most-effective machine learning method for protein interaction prediction. Such methods have been applied for discovering protein interactions on human interactome, specifically the interactome of Membrane proteins and the interactome of Schizophrenia-associated proteins.

As of 2020, a model using residue cluster classes (RCCs), constructed from the 3DID and Negatome databases, resulted in 96-99% correctly classified instances of protein–protein interactions. RCCs are a computational vector space that mimics protein fold space and includes all simultaneously contacted residue sets, which can be used to analyze protein structure-function relation and evolution.

== Databases ==
Large scale identification of PPIs generated hundreds of thousands of interactions, which were collected together in specialized biological databases that are continuously updated in order to provide complete interactomes. The first of these databases was the Database of Interacting Proteins (DIP).

Primary databases collect information about published PPIs proven to exist via small-scale or large-scale experimental methods. Examples: DIP, Biomolecular Interaction Network Database (BIND), Biological General Repository for Interaction Datasets (BioGRID), Human Protein Reference Database (HPRD), IntAct Molecular Interaction Database, Molecular Interactions Database (MINT), MIPS Protein Interaction Resource on Yeast (MIPS-MPact), and MIPS Mammalian Protein–Protein Interaction Database (MIPS-MPPI).<

Meta-databases normally result from the integration of primary databases information, but can also collect some original data.

Prediction databases include many PPIs that are predicted using several techniques (main article). Examples: Human Protein–Protein Interaction Prediction Database (PIPs), Interlogous Interaction Database (I2D), Known and Predicted Protein–Protein Interactions (STRING-db), and Unified Human Interactive (UniHI).

The aforementioned computational methods all depend on source databases whose data can be extrapolated to predict novel protein–protein interactions. Coverage differs greatly between databases. In general, primary databases have the fewest total protein interactions recorded as they do not integrate data from multiple other databases, while prediction databases have the most because they include other forms of evidence in addition to experimental. For example, the primary database IntAct has 572,063 interactions, the meta-database APID has 678,000 interactions, and the predictive database STRING has 25,914,693 interactions. However, some of the interactions in the STRING database are only predicted by computational methods such as Genomic Context and not experimentally verified.

== Interaction networks ==
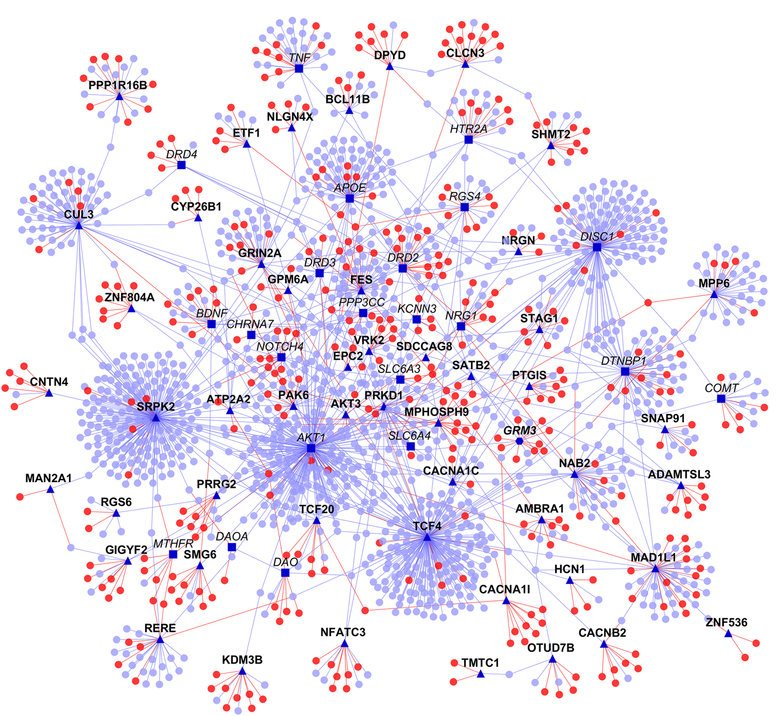
Schizophrenia PPI.

Information found in PPIs databases supports the construction of interaction networks. Although the PPI network of a given query protein can be represented in textbooks, diagrams of whole cell PPIs are frankly complex and difficult to generate.

One example of a manually produced molecular interaction map is the Kurt Kohn's 1999 map of cell cycle control. Drawing on Kohn's map, Schwikowski et al. in 2000 published a paper on PPIs in yeast, linking 1,548 interacting proteins determined by two-hybrid screening. They used a layered graph drawing method to find an initial placement of the nodes and then improved the layout using a force-based algorithm.

Bioinformatic tools have been developed to simplify the difficult task of visualizing molecular interaction networks and complement them with other types of data. For instance, Cytoscape is an open-source software widely used and many plugins are currently available. Pajek software is advantageous for the visualization and analysis of very large networks.

Identification of functional modules in PPI networks is an important challenge in bioinformatics. Functional modules means a set of proteins that are highly connected to each other in PPI network. It is almost similar problem as community detection in social networks. There are some methods such as Jactive modules and MoBaS. Jactive modules integrate PPI network and gene expression data where as MoBaS integrate PPI network and Genome Wide association Studies.

protein–protein relationships are often the result of multiple types of interactions or are deduced from different approaches, including co-localization, direct interaction, suppressive genetic interaction, additive genetic interaction, physical association, and other associations.

=== Signed interaction networks ===
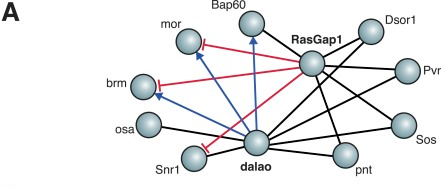
The protein protein interactions are displayed in a signed network that describes what type of interactions that are taking place

Protein–protein interactions often result in one of the interacting proteins either being 'activated' or 'repressed'. Such effects can be indicated in a PPI network by "signs" (e.g. "activation" or "inhibition"). Although such attributes have been added to networks for a long time, Vinayagam et al. (2014) coined the term Signed network for them. Signed networks are often expressed by labeling the interaction as either positive or negative. A positive interaction is one where the interaction results in one of the proteins being activated. Conversely, a negative interaction indicates that one of the proteins being inactivated.

Protein–protein interaction networks are often constructed as a result of lab experiments such as yeast two-hybrid screens or 'affinity purification and subsequent mass spectrometry techniques. However these methods do not provide the layer of information needed in order to determine what type of interaction is present in order to be able to attribute signs to the network diagrams.

==== RNA interference screens ====
RNA interference (RNAi) screens (repression of individual proteins between transcription and translation) are one method that can be utilized in the process of providing signs to the protein–protein interactions. Individual proteins are repressed and the resulting phenotypes are analyzed. A correlating phenotypic relationship (i.e. where the inhibition of either of two proteins results in the same phenotype) indicates a positive, or activating relationship. Phenotypes that do not correlate (i.e. where the inhibition of either of two proteins results in two different phenotypes) indicate a negative or inactivating relationship. If protein A is dependent on protein B for activation then the inhibition of either protein A or B will result in a cell losing the service that is provided by protein A and the phenotypes will be the same for the inhibition of either A or B. If, however, protein A is inactivated by protein B then the phenotypes will differ depending on which protein is inhibited (inhibit protein B and it can no longer inactivate protein A leaving A active however inactivate A and there is nothing for B to activate since A is inactive and the phenotype changes). Multiple RNAi screens need to be performed in order to reliably appoint a sign to a given protein–protein interaction. Vinayagam et al. who devised this technique state that a minimum of nine RNAi screens are required with confidence increasing as one carries out more screens.

== As therapeutic targets ==
Modulation of PPI is challenging and is receiving increasing attention by the scientific community. Several properties of PPI such as allosteric sites and hotspots, have been incorporated into drug-design strategies. Nevertheless, very few PPIs are directly targeted by FDA-approved small-molecule PPI inhibitors, emphasizing a huge untapped opportunity for drug discovery.

In 2014, Amit Jaiswal and others were able to develop 30 peptides to inhibit recruitment of telomerase towards telomeres by utilizing protein–protein interaction studies. Arkin and others were able to develop antibody fragment-based inhibitors to regulate specific protein-protein interactions.

As the "modulation" of PPIs not only includes the inhibition, but also the stabilization of quaternary protein complexes, a paradigm introduced by the discovery of auxin-induced protein complex formation by Ning Zheng, molecules with this mechanism of action (so called molecular glues) are also extensively studied.

=== Examples ===
Inhibitors of protein–protein interactions that have become marketed pharmaceutical drugs include:

- Tirofiban, inhibitor of the glycoprotein IIb/IIIa, used as a cardiovascular drug
- Maraviroc, inhibitor of the CCR5-gp120 interaction, used as anti-HIV drug.
- Venetoclax
- Lifitegrast
- Sotorasib
- Adagrasib

Experimental inhibitors in drug development include:

- AMG-176, AZD5991, S64315, inhibitors of myeloid cell leukemia 1 (Mcl-1) protein and its interactions

== See also ==
- Glycan-protein interactions
- 3did
- Allostery
- Biological network
- Biological machines
- DIMA (database)
- Enzyme catalysis
- HitPredict
- Human interactome
- IsoBase
- Multiprotein complex
- Protein domain dynamics
- Protein flexibility
- Protein structure
- Protein–protein interaction prediction
- Protein–protein interaction screening
- Systems biology
