= 3did =

Biological database

Content
- Description: identification and classification of domain-based interactions of known three-dimensional structure.

Contact
- Laboratory: Institute for Research in Biomedicine, Barcelona, Spain.
- Authors: Amelie Stein
- Primary citation: Stein & al. (2011)
- Release date: 2010

Access
- Website: http://3did.irbbarcelona.org

The database of three-dimensional interacting domains (3did) is a biological database containing a catalogue of protein-protein interactions for which a high-resolution 3D structure is known. 3did collects and classifies all structural models of domain-domain interactions in the Protein Data Bank, providing molecular details for such interactions. 3did uses the Pfam database to define the position of protein domains in the protein structures. 3did was first published in 2005. The current version also includes a pipeline for the discovery and annotation of novel domain-motif interactions. For every interaction 3did identifies and groups different binding modes by clustering similar interfaces into “interaction topologies”. By maintaining a constantly updated collection of domain-based structural interaction templates, 3did is a reference source of information for the structural characterization of protein interaction networks. 3did is updated every six months and is available for bulk download and for browsing at http://3did.irbbarcelona.org.

== See also ==
- protein interaction
- three-dimensional structures
