= Computers in Biology and Medicine =

- Discipline: Computational biology
- Language: English
- Edited by: Sinosh Skariyachan, Lisheng Xu, Qingqing Mao, Rodrigo Capobianco Guido, Suparerk Janjarasjitt, Alejandro Rodríguez González

Publication details
- History: 1970-present
- Publisher: Elsevier
- Frequency: Monthly
- Impact factor: 7.7 (2022)

Standard abbreviations
- ISO 4: Comput. Biol. Med.

Indexing
- CODEN: CBMDAW
- ISSN: 0010-4825 (print); 1879-0534 (web)
- LCCN: 72623964
- OCLC no.: 38840907

Links
- Journal homepage; Online access

Computers in Biology and Medicine is a monthly peer-reviewed scientific journal established in 1970. It covers the intersection of biomedical engineering, computational biology, bioinformatics, and computer science. The journal publishes research articles, reviews, tutorials, editorials, and letters. According to the Journal Citation Reports, the journal has a 2022 impact factor of 7.7.
