= FastContact =

FastContact is an algorithm for the rapid estimate of contact and binding free energies for protein–protein complex structures. It is based on a statistically determined desolvation contact potential and Coulomb electrostatics with a distance-dependent dielectric constant. The application also reports residue contact free energies that rapidly highlight the hotspots of the interaction.

The programme was written in Fortran 77 by Carlos J. Camacho and Chao Zhang at the Department of Computational Biology, University of Pittsburgh, PA. A web server for running FastContact online or downloading the binary was set up by P. Christoph Champ in July 2005.
