= Emergent organization =

An emergent organization (alternatively emergent organisation) is an organization that spontaneously emerges from and exists in a complex dynamic environment or market place, rather than being a construct or copy of something that already exists.

== Overview ==
The term first appeared in the late 1990s and was the topic of the Seventh Annual Washington Evolutionary Systems Conference at University of Ghent, Belgium in May, 1999. Emergent organizations and their dynamics pose interesting questions; for example, how does such an organization achieve closure and stability?

Alternatively, as suggested by James R. Taylor and Elizabeth J. Van Every in their 2000 seminal text, The Emergent Organization, all organizations emerge from communication, especially from the interplay of conversation and text. This idea concerns human organizations, but is consistent with Leibniz or Gabriel Tarde's monadology, or with Alfred North Whitehead's process philosophy, which explains the macro—both in human and non-human "societies"—from the processes taking place between its constituent parts.

== See also ==
- Evolution
- Emergence
- Chaos theory
- Natural selection
- Organizational behavior
- Organizational development
- Self-organizing system
