= EsyN =

esyN (Easy Networks)
- Original author: Cambridge Systems Biology Centre
- Release: September 2014
- Stable release: 2.1 / 17 January 2016; 10 years ago
- Written in: JavaScript
- Type: Bioinformatics software
- Website: esyn.rosalind.kcl.ac.uk

esyN (Easy Networks) is a bioinformatics web-tool for visualizing, building and analysing molecular interaction networks. esyN is based on cytoscape.js and its aim is to make it easy for everybody to perform network analysis. esyN is connected with a number of databases - specifically: pombase, flybase, and most InterMine data warehouses, DrugBank, and BioGRID from which its possible to download the protein protein or genetic interactions for any protein or gene in a number of different organisms.

Networks published in esyN can be easily published in other websites using the <iframe> methodology.

== Usage ==
As of January 2016 esyN is being viewed by 1500 unique users a day (about 16000 a month) according to Google Analytics.

The embedding capabilities of esyN are used by a number of databases to display their interaction data:

- FlyBase
- FlyMine
- HumanMine
- PomBase

== See also ==
- Computational genomics
- Metabolic network modelling
- Protein–protein interaction prediction
