= Life-cycle engineering =

Life-cycle engineering (LCE) is a sustainability-oriented engineering methodology that takes into account the comprehensive technical, environmental, and economic impacts of decisions within the product life cycle. Alternatively, it can be defined as "sustainability-oriented product development activities within the scope of one to several product life cycles." LCE requires analysis to quantify sustainability, setting appropriate targets for environmental impact. The application of complementary methodologies and technologies enables engineers to apply LCE to fulfill environmental objectives.

LCE was first introduced in the 1980s as a bottom-up engineering approach, and widely adopted in the 1990s as a systematic 'cradle-to-grave' approach. The goal of LCE is to find the best possible compromise in product engineering to meet the needs of society while minimizing environmental impacts. The methodology is closely related to, and overlaps with, life-cycle assessment (LCA) to assess environmental impacts; and life cycle costing (LCC) to assess economic impacts.

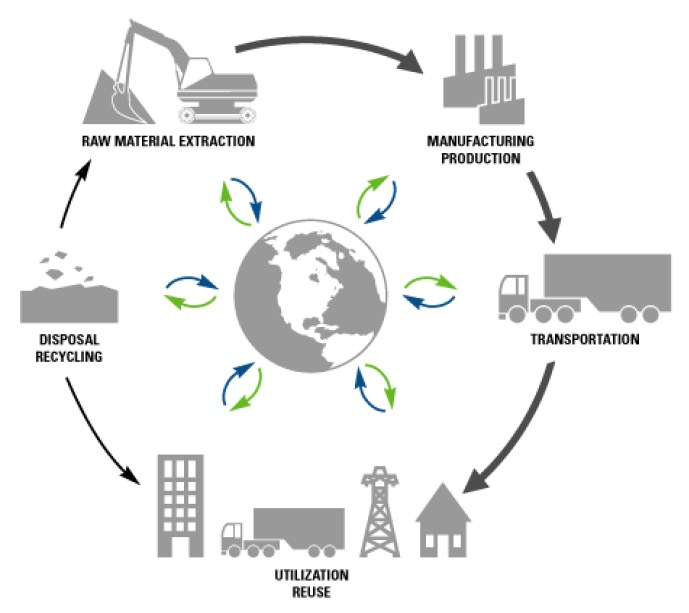
The product life cycle

The product life cycle is formally defined by ISO 14040 as the "consecutive and interlinked stages of a product system, from raw material acquisition or generation from natural resources to final disposal." Comprehensive life cycle analysis considers both upstream and downstream processes. Upstream processes include "the extraction and production of raw materials and manufacturing," and downstream processes include product disposal (such as recycling or sending waste to landfill). LCE aims to reduce the negative consequences of consumption and production, and ensure a good quality standard of living for future generations, by reducing waste and making product development and engineering processes more efficient and sustainable.

== Definition ==
Life cycle engineering is defined in the CIRP Encyclopedia of Production Engineering as:

"the engineering activities which include the application of technological and scientific principles to manufacturing products with the goal of protecting the environment, conserving resources, encouraging economic progress, keeping in mind social concerns, and the need for sustainability, while optimizing the product life cycle and minimizing pollution and waste."

The definition of LCE is often challenged in regard to its primary purpose, but the consensus purpose of LCE is to evaluate and contribute to the improvement of environmental, health, and overall sustainability services and consequences of products at all life cycle stages.

== Quantifying environmental sustainability ==
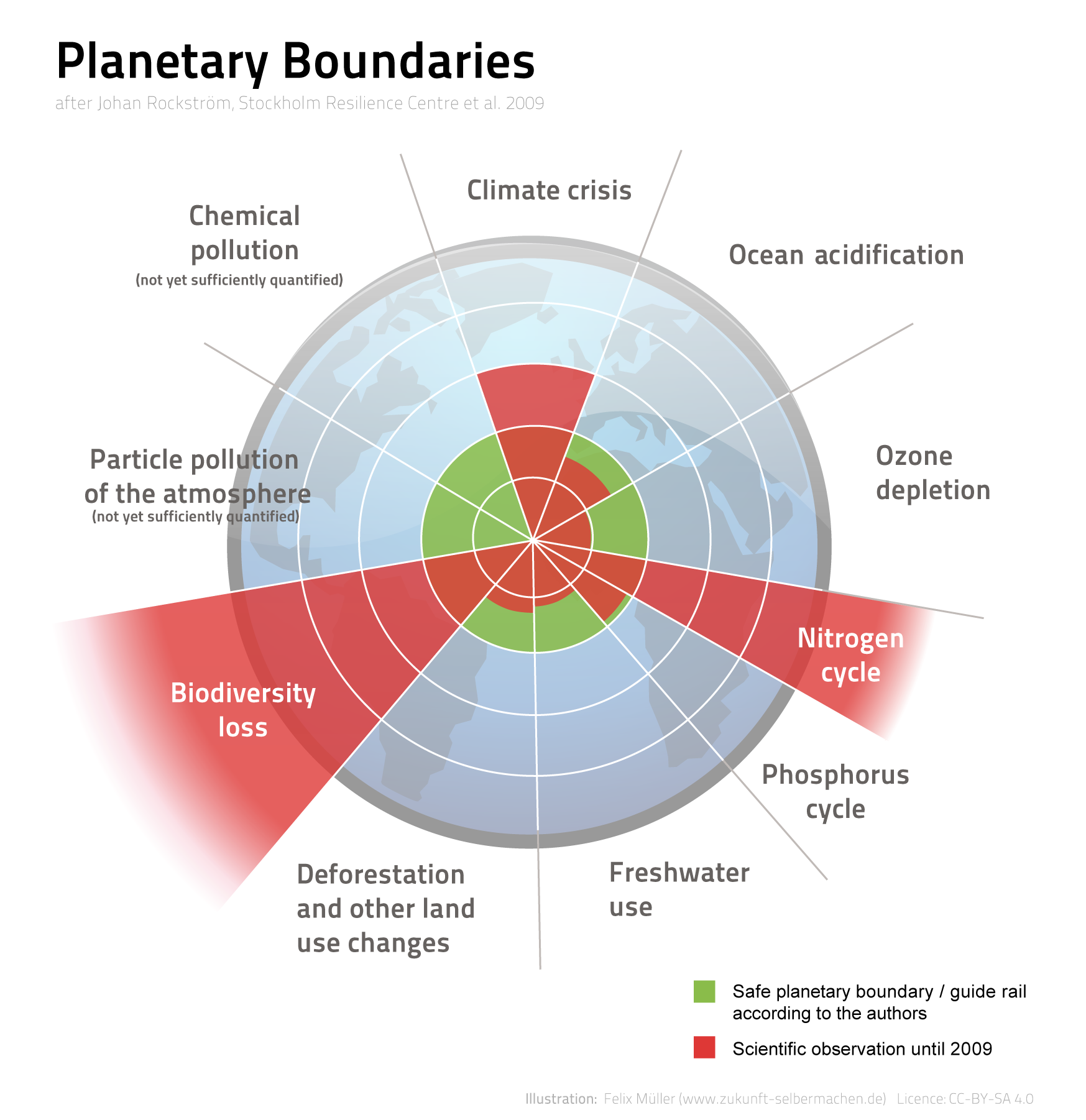
An example of planetary boundaries

The first step in completing LCA or LCE is determining the appropriate sustainability thresholds to use as environmental targets for the product system. The proposed Lyngby framework for LCE is a combined top-down and bottom-up approach for LCE that uses targets based on planetary boundaries. Planetary boundaries can be used to establish limits for the earth's carrying capacity, defining upper thresholds for the environmental system.

The IPAT equation [Impact = Population (or Volume) x Affluence (or Consumption) x Technology (or Consumption per Unit Produced)] is an accepted method for quantifying the impact of consumption. LCE can be leveraged to manage total environmental impact by addressing the technology effect (single product and product life cycle) and the volume effect (anticipated volume growth as consumption and population increase) of product engineering. Impacts are considered within the context of technical boundary conditions to verify the feasibility of proposed solutions.

== Complementary methodologies and technologies ==
Technological developments have created new opportunities for LCE:

- A visual analytics (VA) workflow diagram
  Visual analytics (VA) integrates visualization and data analytics to process large, dynamic data sets and solve complex problems. Researchers gather and synthesize historical and real-time data and information flow across all life cycle stages including impacts from upstream and downstream stages. LCA uses quantified data to build predictive (i.e. simulation-based methods, scenario analysis) and visual models to guide decision-making. By simplifying the presentation of models/results and tailoring visualizations to the audience, VA makes it easier for people to interact with data, enabling collaboration and improved knowledge transfer.
- Augmented reality (AR) and Mixed reality (MR) allow interaction with real and virtual objects in a given environment. In the interpretation phase of LCA, where inventories and process impacts are considered, AR/MR facilitates interaction with complex data sets to investigate scenarios and validate assumptions. It has the potential to break down barriers that inhibit the flow of information.
- Integrated process design is a methodology that involves identifying and integrating processes throughout the entire life cycle with the objective of improving performance. Using this information, analysis identifies enhancements, redefining information exchange and increasing interoperability between systems. The proposed integrated approach promotes synergies between fields like life cycle engineering and product design to improve performance compared to the current product life cycle. These systems and processes need to be integrated to break down barriers when "gathering & synthesizing information flows across life cycle stages."
- Building information modeling (BIM) empowers LCE via digital rendering of buildings and building systems, encouraging more advanced building system analysis through interchange, use, and constant upgrade of building data for the duration of the building life cycle. BIM allows for overall improved information management in buildings and building systems at all points in the life cycle through advanced data visualization, communication and coordination. BIM includes calculation models and processes that estimate environmental impacts of buildings by considering energy use, material use, and emission information throughout the life cycle of building systems.

== Application ==
LCE is most commonly used as a part of green building rating systems or individual parties aiming to assess environmental or sustainability consequences of specific building projects or products. Stakeholders that want to develop more sustainable operations on a life-cycle level or assess their products from a life-cycle perspective use LCE to assess and improve operations to maximize efficiency and meet desired environmental or economic goals. Minimizing adverse environmental consequences and optimizing resource use are two central concepts to the application of LCE.

A major implementation of LCE on an international scale is in the United Nations' Sustainable Development Goals (SDG). The SDGs are 17 goals for international environmental, economic, and social complications or subjects that are to be addressed by 2030. LCE is to be implemented in the solutions to these issues, as they require evaluation and action on a full life-cycle level, and are directly or indirectly tied to sustainable policies and decision-making.

== Key themes in life cycle engineering ==
Key themes in LCE are economic, social, environmental and technological. These themes are interlinking and can be influenced by life cycle engineering.

Theme	Factors relating to product life cycle engineering
Economic	Economic costs Profitability Productivity Quality of products Impact on future investments
Social	Demographics Future generations Backing from environmentalists
Technological	Manufacturing Efficiency Innovation
Environmental	Eco-design Waste reduction Land clearing Nature conservation

== Economic implications ==
Life cycle engineering is an assessment methodology and practice faced with increasing demand in the architectural, construction, and design industries. The shift toward "green building" or sustainable construction has increased the need for LCE in the design, construction, operation, and demolition of buildings. Newly realized environmental and economic benefits of sustainable building practices are determined and made accessible through LCE. LCE provides value to businesses by revealing and quantifying the benefits of sustainable construction with regard to environmental impact, energy reduction, economic savings, and commercial or social attractiveness. The costs LCE or of conducting life-cycle assessment (LCA) and life-cycle cost analysis (LCCA) are outweighed and justified by the benefits of such assessments, increasing the integration of LCE within sustainable construction practices.

Specific demand for LCE in sustainable construction practices can be attributed to green building rating systems such as Leadership in Energy and Environmental Design (LEED) – developed by the U.S. Green Building Council – and Green Globes – developed by the Green Building Initiative. Green building rating systems have supported and encouraged the use of LCE and LCA as methods to improve the standards and requirements of rating systems, while also advancing industry-wide standards for integrated building sustainability considerations.
