= Biological system =

Complex network which connects several biologically relevant entities

A biological system is a complex network which connects several biologically relevant entities. Biological organization spans several scales and is determined based on different structures depending on what the system is. Examples of biological systems at the macro scale are populations of organisms. On the organ and tissue scale in mammals and other animals, examples include the circulatory system, the respiratory system, and the nervous system. On the micro to the nanoscopic scale, examples of biological systems are cells, organelles, macromolecular complexes and regulatory pathways. A biological system is not to be confused with a living system, such as a living organism.

== Organ and tissue systems ==
An example of a system: the brain, the cerebellum, the spinal cord, and the nerves are the four basic components of the nervous system.

These specific systems are widely studied in human anatomy and are also present in many other animals.

- Cardiovascular system (heart and circulatory system): pumping and channeling blood to and from the body and lungs with heart, blood and blood vessels.
- Digestive system: digestion and processing food with salivary glands, oesophagus, stomach, liver, gallbladder, pancreas, intestines, rectum and anus.
- Endocrine system: communication within the body using hormones made by endocrine glands such as the hypothalamus, pituitary gland, pineal body or pineal gland, thyroid, parathyroid and adrenals, i.e., adrenal glands.
- Exocrine system: various functions including lubrication and protection by exocrine glands such sweat glands, mucous glands, lacrimal glands and mammary glands
- Integumentary system: skin, hair, fat, and nails.
- Lymphatic system: structures involved in the transfer of lymph between tissues and the blood stream; includes the lymph and the nodes and vessels. The lymphatic system includes other functions, such as immune responses and development of antibodies.
  - Immune system: protects the organism from foreign bodies.
- Muscular system: allows for manipulation of the environment, provides locomotion, maintains posture, and produces heat. Includes skeletal muscles, smooth muscles and cardiac muscle.
- Nervous system: collecting, transferring and processing information with brain, spinal cord, peripheral nervous system and sense organs.
  - Sensory systems: visual system, auditory system, olfactory system, gustatory system, somatosensory system, vestibular system.
- Reproductive system: the sex organs, such as ovaries, fallopian tubes, uterus, vagina, mammary glands, testes, vas deferens, seminal vesicles and prostate.
- Respiratory system: the organs used for breathing, the pharynx, larynx, bronchi, lungs and diaphragm.
- Skeletal system: structural support and protection with bones, cartilage, ligaments and tendons.
- Urinary system: kidneys, ureters, bladder and urethra involved in fluid balance, electrolyte balance and excretion of urine.

== History ==
The notion of system (or apparatus) relies upon the concept of vital or organic function: a system is a set of organs with a definite function. This idea was already present in Antiquity (Galen, Aristotle), but the application of the term "system" is more recent. For example, the nervous system was named by Monro (1783), but Rufus of Ephesus (c. 90–120), clearly viewed for the first time the brain, spinal cord, and craniospinal nerves as an anatomical unit, although he wrote little about its function, nor gave a name to this unit.

The enumeration of the principal functions - and consequently of the systems - remained almost the same since Antiquity, but the classification of them has been very various, e.g., compare Aristotle, Bichat, Cuvier.

The notion of physiological division of labor, introduced in the 1820s by the French physiologist Henri Milne-Edwards, allowed to "compare and study living things as if they were machines created by the industry of man." Inspired in the work of Adam Smith, Milne-Edwards wrote that the "body of all living beings, whether animal or plant, resembles a factory ... where the organs, comparable to workers, work incessantly to produce the phenomena that constitute the life of the individual." In more differentiated organisms, the functional labor could be apportioned between different instruments or systems (called by him as appareils).

== Cellular organelle systems ==
Artist impression of cell components

The exact components of a cell are determined by whether the cell is a eukaryote or prokaryote.

- Nucleus (eukaryotic only): storage of genetic material; control center of the cell.
- Cytosol: component of the cytoplasm consisting of jelly-like fluid in which organelles are suspended within
- Cell membrane (plasma membrane):
- Endoplasmic reticulum: outer part of the nuclear envelope forming a continuous channel used for transportation; consists of the rough endoplasmic reticulum and the smooth endoplasmic reticulum
  - Rough endoplasmic reticulum (RER): considered "rough" due to the ribosomes attached to the channeling; made up of cisternae that allow for protein production
  - Smooth endoplasmic reticulum (SER): storage and synthesis of lipids and steroid hormones as well as detoxification
- Ribosome: site of biological protein synthesis essential for internal activity and cannot be reproduced in other organs
- Mitochondrion (mitochondria): powerhouse of the cell; site of cellular respiration producing ATP (adenosine triphosphate)
- Lysosome: center of breakdown for unwanted/unneeded material within the cell
- Peroxisome: breaks down toxic materials from the contained digestive enzymes such as H_{2}O_{2}(hydrogen peroxide)
- Golgi apparatus (eukaryotic only): folded network involved in modification, transport, and secretion
- Chloroplast: site of photosynthesis; storage of chlorophyll

== See also ==
- Biological network
- Artificial life
- Biological systems engineering
- Evolutionary systems
- Organ system
- Systems biology
- Systems ecology
- Systems theory
