= Interolog =

An interolog is a conserved interaction between a pair of proteins which have interacting homologs in another organism. The term was introduced in a 2000 paper by Walhout et al.

== Example ==
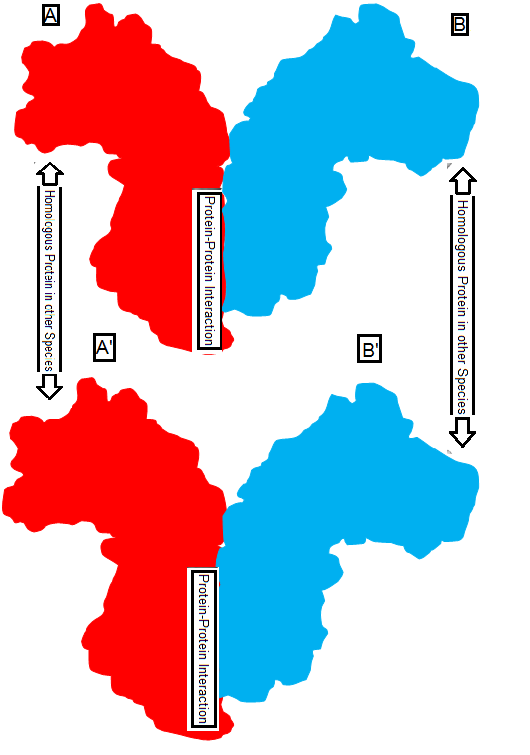

Suppose that A and B are two different interacting human proteins, and A' and B' are two different interacting dog proteins. Then the interaction between A and B is an interolog of the interaction between A' and B' if the following conditions all hold:

- A is a homolog of A'. (Protein homologs have similar amino acid sequences and derive from a common ancestral sequence).
- B is a homolog of B'.
- A and B interact.
- A' and B' interact.

Thus, interologs are homologous pairs of protein interactions across different organisms.

== See also ==
- Homology (biology)
- Systems biology
- Bioinformatics
