= Evolutionary systems =

Evolutionary systems are a type of system, which reproduce with mutation whereby the most fit elements survive, and the less fit die down.

One of the developers of the evolutionary systems thinking is Béla H. Bánáthy.

Evolutionary systems are characterized by "moving equilibria and the dynamics of coevolutionary interactions which can not be foreseen ex ante."

The study of evolutionary systems is an important subcategory of Complex Systems research.

== See also ==
- Biological system
- Emergent organization
- Evolutionary computation
- Evolutionary systems development
