= Biosimulation =

Biosimulation is a computer-aided mathematical simulation of biological processes and systems and thus is an integral part of systems biology. Due to the complexity of biological systems simplified models are often used, which should only be as complex as necessary.

The aim of biosimulations is model-based prediction of the behaviour and the dynamics of biological systems e.g. the response of an organ or a single cell towards a chemical. However the quality of model-based predictions strongly depends on the quality of the model, which in turn is defined by the quality of the data and the profoundness of the knowledge.

== Pharmacy ==
Biosimulation is becoming increasingly important for drug development. Since on average only 11% of all drug candidates are approved, it is anticipated that biosimulation may be the tool to predict whether a candidate drug will fail in the development process e.g. in clinical trials due to adverse side effects, bad pharmacokinetics or even toxicity. The early prediction if a drug will fail in animals or humans would be a key to reduce both drug development costs and the amount of required animal experiments and clinical trials. The latter is also in line with the so-called "3Rs" which refer to the principle of reduction and replacement of animal experiments as well as to the refinement of the methodology in cases where animal tests are still necessary. In a future scenario, biosimulation would change the way substances are tested, in which in vivo and in vitro tests are substituted by tests in silico.

Due to the importance of biosimulation in drug development a number of research projects exist which aim for simulating metabolism, toxicity, pharmacodynamic and pharmacokinetics of a drug candidate. Some of the research projects are listed below:

- BioSim project; funded by the 6th frame program of the European Union
- NSR Physiome Project
- Hepatosys

Moreover, a few software tools already exist, which aim for predicting the toxicity of a substance or even try to simulate the virtual patient (Entelos). A few of these software tools are listed below:

- COPASI
- runBiosimulations
- Tellurium
- Metabolism PhysioLab (Entelos)
- GastroPlus and ADMEPredictor (Simulations-Plus)
- Certara's Simcyp physiologically based pharmacokinetics (PBPK) platform
- RHEDDOS (Rhenovia Pharma SAS)
- VirtualToxLab
- Derek (Lhasa Limited)
- DS TOPKAT (accelrys)
- ADME Workbench
- Applied BioMath Assess
- MATLAB SimBiology
