= Autowave reverberator =

Autowave vortex in a two-dimensional active medium

In the theory of autowave phenomena an autowave reverberator is an autowave vortex in a two-dimensional active medium. (Note: Negligent use of special terms even in scientific literature during the forty years of research of the autowave processes (approximately 1970 to 2010) resulted in rather a lot of confusion in the usage of the names of the rotating autowave. Researchers themselves are often able to guess from the context of what is described in a publication; however, even for researchers from other, albeit related, fields of knowledge is almost impossible to understand the intricacies of autowave processes because of such terms confusion.)

A reverberator appears a result of a rupture in the front of a plane autowave. Such a rupture may occur, for example, via collision of the front with a nonexcitable obstacle. In this case, depending on the conditions, either of two phenomena may arise: a spiral wave, which rotates around the obstacle, or an autowave reverberator which rotates with its tip free.

== Introduction ==
The reverberator was one of the first autowave solutions, researchers found, and, because of this historical context, it remains by nowadays the most studied autowave object.

Up until the late 20th century, the term "auto-wave reverberator" was used very active and widely in the scientific literature, written by soviet authors, because of active developing these investigations in USSR (for more details, see "A brief history of autowave researches" in Autowave). And, inasmuch as the soviet scientific literature was very often republished in English translation (see e.g.), the term "autowave reverberator" became known also in English-speaking countries.

The reverberator is often confused with another state of the active medium, which is similar to it, - with the spiral wave. Indeed, at a superficial glance, these two autowave solutions look almost identical. Moreover, the situation is further complicated by the fact that the spiral wave may under certain circumstances become the reverberator, and the reverberator may, on the contrary, become the spiral wave!

However, it must be remembered that many features of rotating autowaves were quite thoroughly studied as long ago as the 1970s, and already at that time some significant differences in properties of a spiral wave and a reverberator were revealed. Unfortunately, all the detailed knowledge from those years remains now scattered in different publications of the 1970-1990s, which became little-known now even for the new generations of researchers, not to mention the people that are far from this research topic. Perhaps, the only book in that it were more or less completely brought together in the form of abstracts basic information about autowaves, known at the time of its publication, remains still the Proceedings "Autowave processes in systems with diffusion", which was published in 1981 and became already a rare bibliographic edition in nowadays; its content was partially reiterated in another book in 2009.

The differences between a reverberator and a spiral wave are considered below in detail. But for the beginning it is useful to demonstrate these differences with a simple analogy. Everyone knows well the seasons of a year... Under some conditions, winter can turn into summer, and summer, on the contrary, into winter; and, moreover, these miraculous transformations occur quite regularly! However, though a winter and a summer are similar, for example, in regular alternation of day and night, you cannot think of saying that winter and summer are the same thing, can you? Nearly the same things are with reverberator and spiral waves; and therefore they should not be confused.

It is useful also to keep in mind that it is known now, in addition to the rotating-wave, quite a number of other autowave solutions, and every year the number grows continuously with increasing speed. Because of these causes (or as a result of these events), it was found during the 21st century that many of the conclusions about the properties of autowaves, - which were widely known among readers of the early papers on the subject as well as widely discussed in the press of that time, - unfortunately, proved to be a sort of erroneous hasty generalizations.

== Basic information ==
=== "Historical" definition ===
An important difference between a reverberator and a spiral wave rotating around the hole, which is similar to reverberator in the form, is that the reverberator is not tied to any structure in the medium. Due to this property, reverberators can appear and disappear at different locations of the medium.

Click "show" to see the original text in (in Russian)

Важным отличием ревербератора от близкой к нему по форме спиральной волны, вращающейся вокруг отверстия, является то, что ревербератор не привязан к какой-либо структуре в среде. Благодаря этому свойству ревербераторы могут возникать и исчезать в разных местах среды.

— (p.20), 1981,

=== On the question of terminology ===
We note here some of the subtleties the established terminology. A rotating autowave in two-dimensional medium is called by various authors as spiral wave, reverberator, rotor, vortex or even scroll wave. However, one should take into account that these terms are not functionally interchangeable nevertheless (they are not entire synonyms). Briefly the differences between them are as follows.

Ordinarily, the term "spiral wave" refers only to the autowaves rotating around a nonexcitable obstacle in the medium that is of sufficiently large size (that is, in this case, such extent, in which the obstacle is small compared with the size of the medium, and is, however, large enough to provide the autowave break). The tip of the spiral wave moves always along the border of the nonexcitable obstacles.

The most important difference between an autowave reverberator and a close to it in the form spiral wave, which rotates around the obstacle, is that the reverberator is not tied to any structure in the medium. Due to this property reverberators can occur in different places of medium, not only in the absence of nonexcitable obstacles, but generally in a completely homogeneous medium (under appropriate initial conditions). In English scientific literature the most similar in meaning is the term "rotor". However, we give preference to the term reverberator, although it is now less used (in English literature) than the term "rotor", because it has two advantages being: 1) short enough and 2) not busy with other meaning (while the rotor is taken already to call the moving part of an electric motor, and, in addition, the term is used in the mathematical theory of the field). (...)

As for the term "autowave vortex", it can be asserted (at a some stretch, which is especially easy for mathematicians) that reverberator is a two-dimensional vortex (and this is plain truth from the point of view of mathematics). For the natural sciences, which are also biophysics as well as modern medicine, two-dimensional objects do not exist in the real world, and therefore one can say only very conditionally about such two-dimensional objects in these sciences, implying that, in the context of the issues discussed, the thickness of the medium does not affect the behaviour of the phenomenon under consideration.

Looking ahead, we say that a simple scroll is called a three-dimensional vortex that presents identical reverberators at any given time in each section perpendicular to its axis of rotation, and so its behaviour in each of the section is almost identical with behaviour of the reverberator. But this happens only in very limited circumstances, and, in common way, a simple scroll can easily be transformed into more complex objects. Therefore, the substitution of the terms "scroll" and "reverberator" in this case is completely irrelevant, and the term "scroll", in opinion of the authors, is appropriate to use only for description of rotating autowaves in three-dimensional media — i.e., in the cases where you can not neglect the effects caused by the thickness of the medium.

In light of these terminological remarks, we will write "2D-autovortex" ("two-dimensional autowave vortex") in the subsequent text, speaking generally about the autowaves rotating in two-dimensional medium; and particularly, describing behaviour of 2D-autovortex, we will use the appropriate clarifying term - for example, "spiral wave" or "reverberator".

Click "show" to see the original text in (in Russian)

Отметим здесь же некоторые тонкости установившейся терминологии. Разные авторы называют вращающиеся в двумерной среде автоволны спиральными волнами (spiral wave), ревербераторами, роторами (rotor), автоволновыми вихрями (vortex) или даже свитками (scroll wave). Однако следует учитывать, что всё же эти термины не являются полными синонимами. Вкратце различия между ними следующие.

Термином «спиральная волна» обозначают обычно лишь автоволны, вращающиеся вокруг невозбудимого препятствия в среде достаточно большой протяженности, то есть в данном случае такой протяженности, в которой препятствие является малым по сравнению с размером среды, однако достаточно большим, чтобы обеспечивать разрыв автоволны. В спиральной волне ее кончик движется по границе невозбудимого препятствия.

Важнейшим отличием ревербератора от близкой к нему по форме спиральной волны, вращающейся вокруг отверстия, является то, что ревербератор не привязан к какой-либо структуре в среде. Благодаря этому свойству ревербераторы могут возникать в разных местах среды, причем не только при отсутствии невозбудимых препятствия, но и вообще в полностью однородной среде (при подходящих начальных условиях). В англоязычной литературе наиболее близким по смыслу является термин «ротор». Однако в своем изложении мы будем предпочтение отдавать термину ревербератор: хотя оно в настоящее время менее используется, чем термин «ротор», однако имеет два преимущества, одновременно являясь и достаточно коротким, и не занятым другими значениями (в то время как ротором, например, принято уже называть движущуюся часть электромотора, и, кроме того, этот термин широко используется в математической теории поля). (...)

Что же до терминов «автоволновой вихрь», то с некоторыми натяжками (особенно легкими для математиков) можно утверждать, что ревербератор — это двумерный вихрь (и это с точки зрения математики абсолютно верно). Для естественных наук, каковыми являются и биофизика, и современная медицина, двумерных объектов не существует в реальном мире, и поэтому о двумерных объектах в этих науках говорят лишь очень условно, подразумевая при этом лишь то, что в контексте обсуждаемых вопросов толщина среды не сказывается на поведении рассматриваемого или изучаемого явления.

Забегая вперед, скажем, что свитком (простым свитком) называют такой трехмерный вихрь, который в каждый момент времени в сечении, перпендикулярном своей оси вращения, являет собой идентичные ревербераторы, и поэтому его поведение в каждом из сечений практически тождественно поведению ревербератора. Но это происходит лишь в очень ограниченных условиях, а в остальных случаях простой свиток трансформируется в более сложные объекты. Поэтому в данном случае подмена терминов «свиток» и «ревербератор» является совершенно неуместной, и термин «свиток», по мнению авторов, уместно использовать лишь при описании автоволн, вращающихся в трехмерных средах, — то есть в тех случаях, когда нельзя пренебречь эффектами, обусловленными толщиной рассматриваемой среды.

В свете этих терминологических замечаний мы в дальнейшем изложении, говоря вообще о вращающихся в двумерной среде автоволнах, будем использовать сокращение 2D-автовихрь (двумерный автоволновой вихрь), а в частных случаях описания поведения 2D-автовихря мы будем использовать соответствующий уточняющий термин: например, «спиральная волна» или «ревербератор».

— Yu.E. Elkin, A.V. Moskalenko, 2009,

== Types of reverberator behaviour ==
=== The "classical" regimes ===
Various autowave regimes, such as plane waves or spiral waves can exist in an active media, but only under certain conditions on the medium properties. Using the FitzhHugh-Nagumo model for a generic active medium, Winfree constructed a diagram depicting the regions of parameter space in which the principle phenomena may be observed. Such diagrams are a common way of presenting the different dynamical regimes observed in both experimental and theoretical settings. They are sometimes called flower gardens since the paths traced by autowave tips may often resemble the petals of a flower. A flower garden for the FitzHugh-Nagumo model is shown to the right. It contains: the line ∂P, which confines the range of the model parameters under which impulses can propagate through one-dimensional medium, and plane autowaves can spread in the two-dimensional medium; the "rotor boundary" ∂R, which confines the range of the parameters under which there can be the reverberators rotating around fixed cores (i.e. performing uniform circular rotation); the meander boundary ∂M and the hyper-meander boundary ∂C, which confine the areas where two-period and more complex (possibly chaotic) regimes can exist. Rotating autowaves with large cores exist only in the areas with parameters close to the boundary ∂R.

Similar autowave regimes were also obtained for the other models — Beeler-Reuter model, Barkley model, Aliev-Panfilov model, Fenton-Karma model etc.

It was also shown that these simple autowave regimes should be common to all active media because a system of differential equations of any complexity, which describes this or that active medium, can be always simplified to two equations.

In the simplest case without drift (i.e., the regime of uniform circular rotation), the tip of a reverberator rotates around a fixed point along the circumference of a certain radius (the circular motion of the tip of the reverberator). The autowave cannot penetrate into the circle bounded by this circumference. As far as it approaches the centre of the reverberator rotation, the amplitude of the excitation pulse is reduced, and, at a relatively low excitability of the medium there is a region of finite size in the centre of reverberator, where the amplitude of the excitation pulse is zero (recall that we speak now about a homogeneous medium, for each point of which its properties are the same). This area of low amplitude in the centre of the reverberator is usually called the core of the reverberator. The existence of such a region in the center of reverberator seems, at first glance, quite incomprehensible, as it borders all the time with the excited sites. A detailed investigation of this phenomenon showed that resting area in the centre of reverberator remains of its normal excitability, and the existence of a quiescent region in the centre of the reverberator is related to the phenomenon of the critical curvature. In the case of "infinite" homogeneous medium, the core radius and the speed of the rotor rotation are determined only by the properties of the medium itself, rather than the initial conditions. The shape of the front of the rotating spiral wave in the distance from the centre of rotation is close to the evolvent of the circumference - the boundaries of its core. The certain size of the core of the reverberator is conditioned by that the excitation wave, which circulates in a closed path, should completely fit in this path without bumping into its own refractory tail.

As the critical size of the reverberator, it is understood as the minimum size of the homogeneous medium in which the reverberator can exist indefinitely. For assessing the critical size of the reverberator one uses sometimes the size of its core, assuming that adjacent to the core region of the medium should be sufficient for the existence of sustainable re-entry. However, the quantitative study of the dependence of the reverberator behaviour on conductivity of rapid transmembrane current (that characterize the excitability of the medium), it was found that the critical size of the reverberator and the size its core are its different characteristics, and the critical size of the reverberator is much greater, in many cases, than the size of its core (i.e. reverberator dies, even the case, if its core fits easily in the boundaries of the medium and its drift is absent)

=== Regimes of induced drift ===
At meander and hyper-meander, the displacement of the center of autowave rotation (i.e. its drift) is influenced by the forces generated by the very same rotating autowave.

However, in result of the scientific study of rotating autowaves was also identified a number of external conditions that force reverberator drift. It can be, for example, the heterogeneity of the active medium by any parameter. Perhaps, it is the works Biktasheva, where different types of the reverberator drift are currently represented the most completely (although there are other authors who are also involved in the study of drift of the autowave reverberator).

In particular, Biktashev offers to distinguish the following types of reverberator drift in the active medium:

1. Resonant drift.
2. Inhomogeneity induced drift.
3. Anisotropy induced drift.
4. Boundary induced drift (see also).
5. Interaction of spirals.
6. High frequency induced drift.

Note that even for such a simple question, what should be called a drift of autowaves, and what should not be called, there is still no agreement among researchers. Some researchers (mostly mathematicians) tends to consider as reverberator drift only those of its displacement, which occur under the influence of external events (and this view is determined exactly by the peculiarity of the mathematical approach to the study of autowaves). The other part of the researchers did not find significant differences between the spontaneous displacement of reverberator in result of the events generated by it itself, and its displacement as a result of external influences; and therefore these researchers tend to believe that meander and hyper-meander are also variants of drift, namely the spontaneous drift of the reverberator. There was not debate on this question of terminology in the scientific literature, but it can be found easily these features of describing the same phenomena by the different authors.

=== Autowave lacet ===
In the numerical study of reverberator using the Aliev-Panfilov model, the phenomenon of bifurcation memory was revealed, when the reverberator changes spontaneously its behaviour from meander to uniform circular rotation; this new regime was named autowave lacet.

Briefly, spontaneous deceleration of the reverberator drift by the forces generated by the reverberator itself occurs during the autowave lacet, with the velocity of its drift decreasing gradually down to zero in the result. The regime meander thus degenerates into a simple uniform circular rotation. As already mentioned, this unusual process is related to phenomenon of bifurcation memory.

When autowave lacet was discovered, the first question arose: Does the meander exist ever or the halt of the reverberator drift can be observed every time in all the cases, which are called meander, if the observation will be sufficiently long? The comparative quantitative analysis of the drift velocity of reverberator in the regimes of meander and lacet revealed a clear difference between these two types of evolution of the reverberator: while the drift velocity quickly goes to a stationary value during meander, a steady decrease in the drift velocity of the vortex can be observed during the lacet, in which can be clearly identified the phase of slow deceleration and phase of rapid deceleration of the drift velocity.

The revealing of autowave lacet may be important for cardiology. It is known that reverberators show remarkable stability of their properties, they behave "at their discretion", and their behaviour can significantly affect only the events that occur near the tip of reverberator. The fact that the behaviour of the reverberator can significantly be affected only by the events that occur near its core, results, for example, in the fact that, at a meeting with reverberator nonexcitability heterogeneity (e.g. small myocardial scar), the tip of the rotating wave "sticks" to this heterogeneity, and reverberator begins to rotate around the stationary nonexcitability obstacles. The transition from polymorphic to monomorphic tachycardia is observed on the ECG in such cases. This phenomenon is called the "anchoring" of spiral wave. However, it was found in the simulations that spontaneous transition of polymorphic tachycardia in monomorphic one can be observed also on the ECG during the autowave lacet; in other words, the lacet may be another mechanism of transformation of polymorphic ventricular tachycardia in a monomorphic. Thus, the autowave theory predicts the existence of special type of ventricular arrhythmias, conditionally called "lacetic", which cardiologists do not still distinguish in diagnostics.

== The reasons for distinguishing between variants of rotating autowaves ==
Recall that from 1970th to the present time it is customary to distinguish three variants rotating autowaves:

1. wave in the ring,
2. spiral wave,
3. autowave reverberator.

Dimensions of the core of reverberator is usually less than the minimal critical size of the circular path of circulation, which is associated with the phenomenon of critical curvature. In addition, the refractory period appears to be longer for the waves with non-zero curvature (reverberator and spiral wave) and begins to increase with decreasing the excitability of the medium before the refractory period for the plane waves (in the case of circular rotation). These and other significant differences between the reverberator and the circular rotation of excitation wave make us distinguish these two regimes of re-entry.

The figure shows the differences found in the behavior of the plane autowave circulating in the ring and reverberator. You can see that, in the same local characteristics of the excitable medium (excitability, refractoriness, etc., given by the nonlinear member), there are significant quantitative differences between dependencies of the reverberator characteristics and characteristics of the regime of one-dimensional rotation of impulse, although respective dependencies match qualitatively.
