= Biomedicine =

Branch of medical science

Biomedicine (also referred to as Western medicine, mainstream medicine or conventional medicine) is a branch of medical science that applies biological and physiological principles to clinical practice. Biomedicine stresses standardized, evidence-based treatment validated through biological research, with treatment administered via formally trained doctors, nurses, and other such licensed practitioners.

Biomedicine also can relate to many other categories in health and biological related fields. It has been the dominant system of medicine in the Western world for more than a century.

It includes many biomedical disciplines and areas of specialty that typically contain the "bio-" prefix such as molecular biology, biochemistry, biotechnology, cell biology, embryology, nanobiotechnology, biological engineering, laboratory medical biology, cytogenetics, genetics, gene therapy, bioinformatics, biostatistics, systems biology, neuroscience, microbiology, virology, immunology, parasitology, physiology, pathology, anatomy, toxicology, and many others that generally concern life sciences as applied to medicine.

== Overview ==
Biomedicine is the cornerstone of modern health care and laboratory diagnostics. It concerns a wide range of scientific and technological approaches: from in vitro diagnostics to in vitro fertilisation, from the molecular mechanisms of cystic fibrosis to the population dynamics of the HIV virus, from the understanding of molecular interactions to the study of carcinogenesis, from a single-nucleotide polymorphism (SNP) to gene therapy.

Biomedicine is based on molecular biology and combines all issues of developing molecular medicine into large-scale structural and functional relationships of the human genome, transcriptome, proteome, physiome and metabolome with the particular point of view of devising new technologies for prediction, diagnosis and therapy.

Biomedicine involves the study of (patho-) physiological processes with methods from biology and physiology. Approaches range from understanding molecular interactions to the study of the consequences at the in vivo level. These processes are studied with the particular point of view of devising new strategies for diagnosis and therapy.

Depending on the severity of the disease, biomedicine pinpoints a problem within a patient and fixes the problem through medical intervention. Medicine focuses on curing diseases rather than improving one's health.

In social sciences biomedicine is described somewhat differently. Through an anthropological lens biomedicine extends beyond the realm of biology and scientific facts; it is a socio-cultural system which collectively represents reality. While biomedicine is traditionally thought to have no bias due to the evidence-based practices, Gaines & Davis-Floyd (2004) highlight that biomedicine itself has a cultural basis and this is because biomedicine reflects the norms and values of its creators.

== Molecular biology ==
Molecular biology is the process of synthesis and regulation of a cell's DNA, RNA, and protein. Molecular biology consists of different techniques including Polymerase chain reaction, Gel electrophoresis, and macromolecule blotting to manipulate DNA.

Polymerase chain reaction is done by placing a mixture of the desired DNA, DNA polymerase, primers, and nucleotide bases into a machine. The machine heats up and cools down at various temperatures to break the hydrogen bonds binding the DNA and allows the nucleotide bases to be added onto the two DNA templates after it has been separated.

Gel electrophoresis is a technique used to identify similar DNA between two unknown samples of DNA. This process is done by first preparing an agarose gel. This jelly-like sheet will have wells for DNA to be poured into. An electric current is applied so that the DNA, which is negatively charged due to its phosphate groups is attracted to the positive electrode. Different rows of DNA will move at different speeds because some DNA pieces are larger than others. Thus if two DNA samples show a similar pattern on the gel electrophoresis, one can tell that these DNA samples match.

Macromolecule blotting is a process performed after gel electrophoresis. An alkaline solution is prepared in a container. A sponge is placed into the solution and an agarose gel is placed on top of the sponge. Next, nitrocellulose paper is placed on top of the agarose gel and a paper towels are added on top of the nitrocellulose paper to apply pressure. The alkaline solution is drawn upwards towards the paper towel. During this process, the DNA denatures in the alkaline solution and is carried upwards to the nitrocellulose paper. The paper is then placed into a plastic bag and filled with a solution full of the DNA fragments, called the probe, found in the desired sample of DNA. The probes anneal to the complementary DNA of the bands already found on the nitrocellulose sample. Afterwards, probes are washed off and the only ones present are the ones that have annealed to complementary DNA on the paper. Next the paper is stuck onto an x ray film. The radioactivity of the probes creates black bands on the film, called an autoradiograph. As a result, only similar patterns of DNA to that of the probe are present on the film. This allows us the compare similar DNA sequences of multiple DNA samples. The overall process results in a precise reading of similarities in both similar and different DNA sample.

== Biochemistry ==
Biochemistry is the science of the chemical processes which takes place within living organisms. Living organisms need essential elements to survive, among which are carbon, hydrogen, nitrogen, oxygen, calcium, and phosphorus. These elements make up the four macromolecules that living organisms need to survive: carbohydrates, lipids, proteins, and nucleic acids.

Carbohydrates, made up of carbon, hydrogen, and oxygen, are energy-storing molecules. The simplest carbohydrate is glucose (C_{6}H_{12}O_{6}) which is used in cellular respiration to produce ATP, adenosine triphosphate, which supplies cells with energy.

Proteins are chains of amino acids that function, among other things, to contract skeletal muscle, as catalysts, as transport molecules, and as storage molecules. Protein catalysts can facilitate biochemical processes by lowering the activation energy of a reaction. Hemoglobins are also proteins, carrying oxygen to an organism's cells.

Lipids, also known as fats, are small molecules derived from biochemical subunits from either the ketoacyl or isoprene groups. Creating eight distinct categories: fatty acids, glycerolipids, glycerophospholipids, sphingolipids, saccharolipids, and polyketides (derived from condensation of ketoacyl subunits); and sterol lipids and prenol lipids (derived from condensation of isoprene subunits). Their primary purpose is to store energy over the long term. Due to their unique structure, lipids provide more than twice the amount of energy that carbohydrates do. Lipids can also be used as insulation. Moreover, lipids can be used in hormone production to maintain a healthy hormonal balance and provide structure to cell membranes.

Nucleic acids are a key component of DNA, the main genetic information-storing substance, found oftentimes in the cell nucleus, and controls the metabolic processes of the cell. DNA consists of two complementary antiparallel strands consisting of varying patterns of nucleotides. RNA is a single strand of DNA, which is transcribed from DNA and used for DNA translation, which is the process for making proteins out of RNA sequences.

== See also ==
- List of psychoactive substances and precursor chemicals derived from genetically modified organisms
- Cardiophysics
- Diagnosis – Identification of the nature and cause of a certain phenomenon
- Medicinal chemistry – Scientific branch of chemistry
- Medical physics – Application of physics in medicine or healthcare
- The Cancer Genome Atlas – Project to catalogue genetic mutations responsible for cancer
- The Convention on Human Rights and Biomedicine – International treaty
- The Human Genome Project – International scientific research project (1990–2003)
- The Human Physiome Project – Wholistic physiological dynamics of an organism
