= EuResist =

International project designed to improve the treatment of HIV patients

- Release: 2006
- Operating system: Cross-platform
- Website: www.euresist.org

EuResist is an international project designed to improve the treatment of HIV patients by developing a computerized system that can recommend optimal treatment based on the patient's clinical and genomic data.

The project is part of the Virtual Physiological Human framework, funded by the European Commission. It started in 2006 with the formation of a consortium of several research institutes and hospitals in Europe and Israel. The consortium completed its commitment to the European Commission near the end of 2008, at which time the system became available online. A non-profit organization was consequently established by the main partners to maintain and improve the system.

== Background ==
AIDS is a disease caused by the HIV retrovirus, which progressively reduces the effectiveness of the immune system, leading to infections and ultimately death.

More than 30 different drugs exist for treating HIV patients. Antiretroviral drugs can disrupt the virus's replication process, causing its numbers to decrease dramatically. While the virus cannot be eradicated, in small numbers, it is harmless. Usually, a patient is given a combination of three or four drugs, a treatment known as highly active antiretroviral therapy, or HAART. The main reason such a treatment might fail is the development of mutated strands of the virus, resistant to one or more of the prescribed drugs.

Thus, an important consideration when choosing treatment for a patient is to prescribe those drugs to which the particular patient's virus strains are most susceptible. One way to achieve that is to extract virus samples from the patient's blood and test them against all possible drugs. Since this process is lengthy and costly, computerized systems have been developed to predict virus resistance based on its genotype. The treating physician samples virus genotype sequences from the patient's blood and provides this data to a computerized system. The system then responds with drug recommendations.

Such systems are limited in accuracy, depending on the amount of data used for their creation, its quality, and the richness of mathematical models used for the actual prediction. Before EuResist, such systems had several common characteristics that negatively impacted their accuracy:

- The amount of data used for creating the system was relatively small
- This data was in vitro data: laboratory measures of the resistance of various strains of HIV to individual drugs. Such data is known to be inaccurate because laboratory tests do not simulate exactly the processes of a living organism, and since resistance to individual drugs does not accurately predict resistance to a combination of drugs.
- They used a relatively simple mathematical prediction model

== Purpose ==
The goal of EuResist was to develop a clinical decision support system for determining the most effective antiretroviral therapy for people diagnosed with HIV, based on clinical and virological data. To do so required collecting a large database of in vivo data (clinical and genomic records of real treatments of HIV patients and their consequences), and using an array of prediction models instead of just one for improved prediction accuracy.

The database was created by merging local databases of various clinics across Europe. For each patient, it includes various personal and demographic details such as gender, age, country of origin, genomic sequencing of HIV found in the patient's blood, records of the drugs prescribed, and the changes in the amount of virus in the blood following these treatments.

This data was used to train an array of machine learning prediction models, among them Bayesian networks, logistic regression, and others. The model is accessed using a web interface, allowing physicians to specify patients' clinical and genomic data. This data is sent to the prediction engines, and the combined response, which is displayed to the physician, includes various suggested treatments and a prediction of their effect on the amount of HIV in the blood.

The EuResist system was tested and compared with its predecessors by feeding it with historical data on patients for whom treatment results are known. In one study in 2011 conducted by the British HIV Association, with a modest sample size of 15 treatment successes and 10 treatment failures, it was found that EuResist performed "comparably to or better than human experts".

== History ==
EuResist started in 2006 as a consortium funded by the European Union as part of the Virtual Physiological Human FP-6 framework. The partners of this consortium were:

- IBM Haifa Research Laboratory (Israel)
- Informa S.r.l. (Italy)
- Karolinska Institutet (Sweden)
- Kingston University (United Kingdom)
- Max Planck Institute for Informatics (Germany)
- MTA Wigner Fizikai Kutatóközpont Részecske- és Magfizikai Intézet (Hungary)
- University of Siena (Italy)
- Universitätsklinikum Köln (Germany)

The consortium completed its commitment to the European Union in late 2008, at which time the EuResist system became available online. The first five partners mentioned above continued to form a non-profit organization that maintains the system, expands the database with new clinical and genomic records, and updates the prediction engines accordingly. As of mid-2010, an average of 600 queries is submitted to the EuResist system every quarter.

In 2010, it was reportedly the first decision support system of its kind to be available for free use online for customised highly active antiretroviral therapy for HIV.

== Awards ==
On June 1, 2009, EuResist received a Computerworld Honors Program laureate award, a global program honoring individuals and organizations that use information technology to benefit society.
