= Excitable =

Excitable may refer to:

- a song on the 1987 Def Leppard album Hysteria
- a hit song by the British band Amazulu
- a cell that can respond to stimuli

== See also ==
- Excitable medium (mathematics / system analysis)
- Cell excitability (biology)
