= CDH12 =

Protein-coding gene in humans

Identifiers
- Aliases: CDH12, CDHB, cadherin 12
- External IDs: OMIM: 600562; MGI: 109503; GeneCards: CDH12

Gene location (Human)
Chr.	Chromosome 5 (human)
Band	5p14.3	Start	21,750,673 bp
Band	5p14.3	End	22,853,622 bp

Gene location (Mouse)
Chr.	Chromosome 15 (mouse)
Band	15 A2|15 8.25 cM	Start	20,449,351 bp
Band	15 A2|15 8.25 cM	End	21,589,619 bp
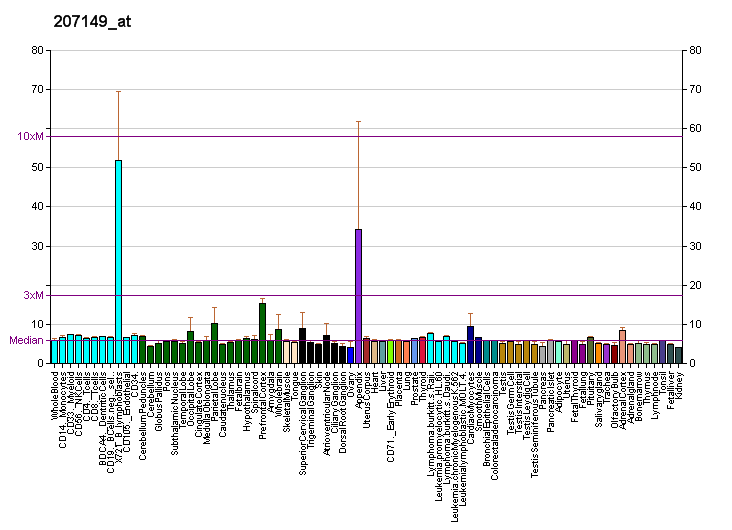
RNA expression pattern
Bgee	Human / Mouse (ortholog); Top expressed in: testicle; middle temporal gyrus; postcentral gyrus; Brodmann area 23; right uterine tube; primary visual cortex; frontal pole; Brodmann area 10; superior frontal gyrus; entorhinal cortex / Top expressed in: internal pyramidal layer of neocortex; external pyramidal layer of neocortex; granular layer of dentate gyrus; external granular layer; dentate gyrus of hippocampal formation granule cell; thalamus; primary visual cortex; epithalamus; CA3 field; dorsal cochlear nucleus; More reference expression data
BioGPS	More reference expression data
Gene ontology
Molecular function	calcium ion binding; metal ion binding; cytoskeletal protein binding; protein homodimerization activity; cadherin binding
Cellular component	integral component of membrane; plasma membrane; membrane; cell surface; catenin complex
Biological process	cell adhesion; adherens junction organization; homophilic cell adhesion via plasma membrane adhesion molecules; cell-cell junction assembly; calcium-dependent cell-cell adhesion via plasma membrane cell adhesion molecules; cell-cell adhesion mediated by cadherin; cell-cell adhesion; cell morphogenesis
Sources:Amigo / QuickGO
Orthologs
Databases	NCBI: entry; OMA: entry
Species	Human	Mouse
Entrez	1010	215654
Ensembl	ENSG00000154162	ENSMUSG00000040452
UniProt	P55289	Q5RJH3
RefSeq (mRNA)	NM_004061; NM_001317227; NM_001317228	NM_001008420
RefSeq (protein)	NP_001304156; NP_001304157; NP_004052; NP_001351033; NP_001351034 NP_001351035; NP_001351036; NP_001351037; NP_001351038	NP_001008420
Location (UCSC)	Chr 5: 21.75 – 22.85 Mb	Chr 15: 20.45 – 21.59 Mb
PubMed search
- Wikidata
View/Edit Human	View/Edit Mouse

Cadherin-12 is a protein that in humans is encoded by the CDH12 gene.

This gene encodes a type II classical cadherin from the cadherin superfamily of integral membrane proteins that mediate calcium-dependent cell-cell adhesion. Mature cadherin proteins are composed of a large N-terminal extracellular domain, a single membrane-spanning domain, and a small, highly conserved C-terminal cytoplasmic domain. Type II (atypical) cadherins are defined based on their lack of an HAV cell adhesion recognition sequence specific to type I cadherins. This particular cadherin appears to be expressed specifically in the brain and its temporal pattern of expression would be consistent with a role during a critical period of neuronal development, perhaps specifically during synaptogenesis.
