= Living Human Project =

The Living Human Project (LHP) is a project that begun in 2002 to develop a distributed repository of anatomo-functional data and simulation algorithms for the human musculoskeletal apparatus used to create the physiome of the human musculoskeletal system. In 2006 the BEL was merged with Biomed Town, an Internet community for those who have a professional interest in biomedical research.

== Living Human Digital Library ==
The LHDL project was ended in January 2009, and soon after the LHDL consortium released a biomedical data management and sharing service called Physiome Space. Physiome Space lets individual researchers as well as for large consortia to share with their peers large collections of biomedical data, including medical imaging and computer simulations.

== See also ==
- List of omics topics in biology
- Virtual Physiological Human
- Physiomics
- Physiome
- Physiology
- EuroPhysiome
- Human anatomy
