= Bifurcation =

Bifurcation or bifurcated may refer to:

== Science and technology ==
- Bifurcation theory, the study of sudden changes in dynamical systems
  - Bifurcation, of an incompressible flow, modeled by squeeze mapping the fluid flow
- River bifurcation, the forking of a river into its distributaries
- Bifurcation lake, a lake that flows into two different drainage basins
- Bifurcated bonding: a single hydrogen atom participates in two hydrogen bonds
- Bifurcated stick grip, a type of aircraft control column

== Other uses ==
- Bifurcation (law), the division of issues in a trial

== See also ==
- Aortic bifurcation, the point at which the abdominal aorta bifurcates into the left and right common iliac arteries
- Tracheal bifurcation, or the carina of trachea (Latin: bifurcatio tracheae)
- Bifurcation diagram
- Bifurcate merging, a kinship system
- False dilemma or bifurcation
- Tongue bifurcation (disambiguation)
- Fork (disambiguation)
