= Spatiotemporal pattern =

Patterns in both time and space

Computer simulation of the Belousov–Zhabotinsky reaction, which has non-equilibrium thermodynamics

Spatiotemporal patterns are patterns that occur in a wide range of natural phenoma and are characterized by a spatial and temporal patterning. The general rules of pattern formation hold. In contrast to "static", pure spatial patterns, the full complexity of spatiotemporal patterns can only be recognized over time. Any kind of traveling wave is a good example of a spatiotemporal pattern. Besides the shape and amplitude of the wave (spatial part), its time-varying position (and possibly shape) in space is an essential part of the entire pattern.

The distinction between spatial and spatio-temporal patterns in nature is not clear-cut because a static, invariable pattern will never occur in the strict sense. Even rock formations will slowly change on a time-scale of tens of millions of years, therefore the distinction lies in the time scale of change in relation to human experience. Already the snapshot state of a dune will usually be taken as an example of a purely spatial pattern although this is clearly not the case. It is thus apt to say that spatiotemporal patterns in nature are the rule rather than the exception.

== Physics ==
Many hydrodynamical systems show s.t. pattern formation:

- Rayleigh–Bénard convection
- Taylor–Couette flow
- Liquid crystal instabilities

== Chemistry ==
Any type of reaction–diffusion system that produces spatial patterns will also, due to the time-dependency of both reactions and diffusion, produce spatiotemporal patterns.

== Biology ==
=== Neurobiology ===
Neural networks, both artificial and natural, produce a virtually unbounded variety of s.t. patterns, both in sensory perception, learning, thinking and reasoning as well as in spontaneous activity. It has for example been demonstrated that spiral waves, signatures of many excitable systems can occur in neocortical preparations.

=== Communication ===
All communication, language, relies on spatiotemporal encoding of information, producing and transmitting sound variations or any type of signal i.e. single building blocks of information that are varied over time. -Even though written language appears to exist only as a (2D) spatial concatenation of letters - strings, it must be decoded sequentially over time. Any kind of language that is understood by organisms is thus eventually a transcoding of neural s.t. signals and will - in successful communication - evoke similar patterns of neural activity in the recipient as they existed in the sender. For example, the warning call of a bird when it perceives a predator will produce a similar type and degree of alarmedness (eventually a certain kind of neural activity pattern) in other individuals even though they have not yet seen or heard the potential attacker.

Even artificial languages, e.g. computer languages, are not read and interpreted in one step, but sequentially, thus, their meaningfully arranged vocabulary (e.g. "computer code") can be seen as a s.t. pattern.

=== Genetics ===
As a particular type of language, the "static" (neglecting random transcription errors, recombination and mutation) DNA and its transcription pattern over time yields biologically essential s.t. patterns. Gene regulatory networks are responsible for regulation the time course of gene expression level which can be analyzed using expression profiling.

=== Crime ===
Criminals show spatiotemporal patterns when planning and executing their activities that may be used to predict their future behaviour. Temporal patterns may apply to preferred times when crimes are committed. Spatial patterns can be identified in potential targets and routes for criminal activities.

Spatial patterns may be used to identify the most likely locations for crimes to occur, or to identify potential escape routes. In addition, criminals often use temporal and spatial patterns to hide their activities, such as by committing crimes in areas with low population density or in areas with limited surveillance. By understanding spatiotemporal patterns in relation to crime, law enforcement and crime prevention professionals can develop strategies to better prevent and respond to criminal activities. For example, law enforcement can use spatiotemporal patterns to identify crime hot spots and to determine the most effective strategies for responding to these areas. In addition, law enforcement and crime prevention professionals can use spatiotemporal patterns to identify and monitor potential suspects or areas of criminal activity.

== Literature ==
- Daniel Walgraef (2012). Spatio-Temporal Pattern Formation: With Examples from Physics, Chemistry, and Materials Science. Springer. ISBN 9781461218500.
