= Refractory period (physiology) =

State of unresponsiveness to repeated stimuli

Refractoriness is the fundamental property of any object of autowave nature (especially excitable medium) not responding to stimuli, if the object stays in the specific refractory state. In common sense, refractory period is the characteristic recovery time, a period that is associated with the motion of the image point on the left branch of the isocline $\dot{u} = 0$ (for more details, see also Reaction–diffusion and Parabolic partial differential equation).

Schematic of an electrophysiological recording of an action potential showing the various phases that occur as the wave passes a point on a cell membrane.

In physiology, a refractory period is a period of time during which an organ or cell is incapable of repeating a particular action, or (more precisely) the amount of time it takes for an excitable membrane to be ready for a second stimulus once it returns to its resting state following an excitation. It most commonly refers to electrically excitable muscle cells or neurons. Absolute refractory period corresponds to depolarization and repolarization, whereas relative refractory period corresponds to hyperpolarization.

== Electrochemical usage ==
After initiation of an action potential, the refractory period is defined two ways: The absolute refractory period coincides with nearly the entire duration of the action potential. In neurons, it is caused by the inactivation of the voltage-gated sodium channels that originally opened to depolarize the membrane. These channels remain inactivated until the membrane hyperpolarizes. The channels then close, de-inactivate, and regain their ability to open in response to stimulus.

The relative refractory period immediately follows the absolute. As voltage-gated potassium channels open to terminate the action potential by repolarizing the membrane, the potassium conductance of the membrane increases dramatically. K^{+} ions moving out of the cell bring the membrane potential closer to the equilibrium potential for potassium. This causes brief hyperpolarization of the membrane, that is, the membrane potential becomes transiently more negative than the normal resting potential. Until the potassium conductance returns to the resting value, a greater stimulus will be required to reach the initiation threshold for a second depolarization. The return to the equilibrium resting potential marks the end of the relative refractory period.

== Cardiac refractory period ==
Effective Refractory Period

The refractory period in cardiac physiology is related to the ion currents that, in cardiac cells as in nerve cells, flow into and out of the cell freely. The flow of ions translates into a change in the voltage of the inside of the cell relative to the extracellular space. As in nerve cells, this characteristic change in voltage is referred to as an action potential. Unlike that in nerve cells, the cardiac action potential duration is closer to 100 ms (with variations depending on cell type, autonomic tone, etc.). After an action potential initiates, the cardiac cell is unable to initiate another action potential for some duration of time (which is slightly shorter than the "true" action potential duration). This period of time is referred to as the refractory period, which is 250ms in duration and helps to protect the heart.

In the classical sense, the cardiac refractory period is separated into an absolute refractory period and a relative refractory period. During the absolute refractory period, a new action potential cannot be elicited. During the relative refractory period, a new action potential can be elicited under the correct circumstances.

The cardiac refractory period can result in different forms of re-entry, which are a cause of tachycardia. Vortices of excitation in the myocardium (autowave vortices) are a form of re-entry. Such vortices can be a mechanism of life-threatening cardiac arrhythmias. In particular, the autowave reverberator, more commonly referred to as spiral waves or rotors, can be found within the atria and may be a cause of atrial fibrillation.

== Neuronal refractory period ==
The refractory period in a neuron occurs after an action potential and generally lasts one millisecond. An action potential consists of three phases.

Phase one is depolarization. During depolarization, voltage-gated sodium ion channels open, increasing the neuron's membrane conductance for sodium ions and depolarizing the cell's membrane potential (from typically -70 mV toward a positive potential). In other words, the membrane is made less negative. After the potential reaches the activation threshold (-55 mV), the depolarization is actively driven by the neuron and overshoots the equilibrium potential of an activated membrane (+30 mV).

Phase two is repolarization. During repolarization, voltage-gated sodium ion channels inactivate (different from the closed state) due to the probabilistic movements of the ball-and-chain model. Now, due to the depolarization of the cell membrane, voltage-gated potassium channels activate (open). Both the inactivation of the sodium ion channels and the opening of the potassium ion channels act to repolarize the cell's membrane potential back to its resting membrane potential.

When the cell's membrane voltage overshoots its resting membrane potential (near -60 mV), the cell enters a phase of hyperpolarization. This is due to a larger-than-resting potassium conductance across the cell membrane. This potassium conductance eventually drops and the cell returns to its resting membrane potential.

Recent research has shown that neuronal refractory periods can exceed 20 milliseconds. Furthermore, the relation between hyperpolarization and the neuronal refractory was questioned, as neuronal refractory periods were observed for neurons that do not exhibit hyperpolarization. The neuronal refractory period was shown to be dependent on the origin of the input signal to the neuron, as well as the preceding spiking activity of the neuron.

The refractory periods are due to the inactivation property of voltage-gated sodium channels and the lag of potassium channels in closing. Voltage-gated sodium channels have two gating mechanisms, the activation mechanism that opens the channel with depolarization and the inactivation mechanism that closes the channel with repolarization. While the channel is in the inactive state, it will not open in response to depolarization. The period when the majority of sodium channels remain in the inactive state is the absolute refractory period. After this period, there are enough voltage-activated sodium channels in the closed (active) state to respond to depolarization. However, voltage-gated potassium channels that opened in response to repolarization do not close as quickly as voltage-gated sodium channels; to return to the active closed state. During this time, the extra potassium conductance means that the membrane is at a higher threshold and will require a greater stimulus to cause action potentials to fire. In other words, because the membrane potential inside the axon becomes increasingly negative relative to the outside of the membrane, a stronger stimulus will be required to reach the threshold voltage, and thus, initiate another action potential. This period is the relative refractory period.

== Skeletal muscle refractory period ==
The muscle action potential lasts roughly 2–4 ms and the absolute refractory period is roughly 1–3 ms, shorter than other cells.

== See also ==
- Autowave
- Parabolic partial differential equation
- Reaction–diffusion system
