= Systems biology =

Computational and mathematical modeling of complex biological systems

Systems biology is the computational and mathematical analysis and modeling of complex biological systems. It is a biology-based interdisciplinary field of study that focuses on complex interactions within biological systems, using a holistic approach (holism instead of the more traditional reductionism) to biological research. This multifaceted research domain necessitates the collaborative efforts of chemists, biologists, mathematicians, physicists, and engineers to decipher the biology of intricate living systems by merging various quantitative molecular measurements with carefully constructed mathematical models. It represents a comprehensive method for comprehending the complex relationships within biological systems. In contrast to conventional biological studies that typically center on isolated elements, systems biology seeks to combine different biological data to create models that illustrate and elucidate the dynamic interactions within a system. This methodology is essential for understanding the complex networks of genes, proteins, and metabolites that influence cellular activities and the traits of organisms. One of the aims of systems biology is to model and discover emergent properties, of cells, tissues and organisms functioning as a system whose theoretical description is only possible using techniques of systems biology. By exploring how function emerges from dynamic interactions, systems biology bridges the gaps that exist between molecules and physiological processes.

As a paradigm, systems biology is usually defined in antithesis to the so-called reductionist paradigm (biological organisation), although it is consistent with the scientific method. The distinction between the two paradigms is referred to in these quotations: "the reductionist approach has successfully identified most of the components and many of the interactions but, unfortunately, offers no convincing concepts or methods to understand how system properties emerge ... the pluralism of causes and effects in biological networks is better addressed by observing, through quantitative measures, multiple components simultaneously and by rigorous data integration with mathematical models." (Sauer et al.) "Systems biology ... is about putting together rather than taking apart, integration rather than reduction. It requires that we develop ways of thinking about integration that are as rigorous as our reductionist programmes, but different. ... It means changing our philosophy, in the full sense of the term." (Denis Noble)

The central flow of biological information and the corresponding omics fields, emphasizing the systems biology approach of integrating genomics, transcriptomics, proteomics, and metabolomics to link genotype to phenotype.

As a series of operational protocols used for performing research, namely a cycle composed of theory, analytic or computational modelling to propose specific testable hypotheses about a biological system, experimental validation, and then using the newly acquired quantitative description of cells or cell processes to refine the computational model or theory. Since the objective is a model of the interactions in a system, the experimental techniques that most suit systems biology are those that are system-wide and attempt to be as complete as possible. Therefore, multiomics (transcriptomics, metabolomics, proteomics, etc) and high-throughput techniques are used to collect quantitative data for the construction and validation of models.

A comprehensive systems biology approach necessitates: (i) a thorough characterization of an organism concerning its molecular components, the interactions among these molecules, and how these interactions contribute to cellular functions; (ii) a detailed spatio-temporal molecular characterization of a cell (for example, component dynamics, compartmentalization, and vesicle transport); and (iii) an extensive systems analysis of the cell's 'molecular response' to both external and internal perturbations. Furthermore, the data from (i) and (ii) should be synthesized into mathematical models to test knowledge by generating predictions (hypotheses), uncovering new biological mechanisms, assessing the system's behavior derived from (iii), and ultimately formulating rational strategies for controlling and manipulating cells. To tackle these challenges, systems biology must incorporate methods and approaches from various disciplines that have not traditionally interfaced with one another. The emergence of multi-omics technologies has transformed systems biology by providing extensive datasets that cover different biological layers, including genomics, transcriptomics, proteomics, and metabolomics. These technologies enable the large-scale measurement of biomolecules, leading to a more profound comprehension of biological processes and interactions. Increasingly, methods such as network analysis, machine learning, and pathway enrichment are utilized to integrate and interpret multi-omics data, thereby improving our understanding of biological functions and disease mechanisms.

== History ==
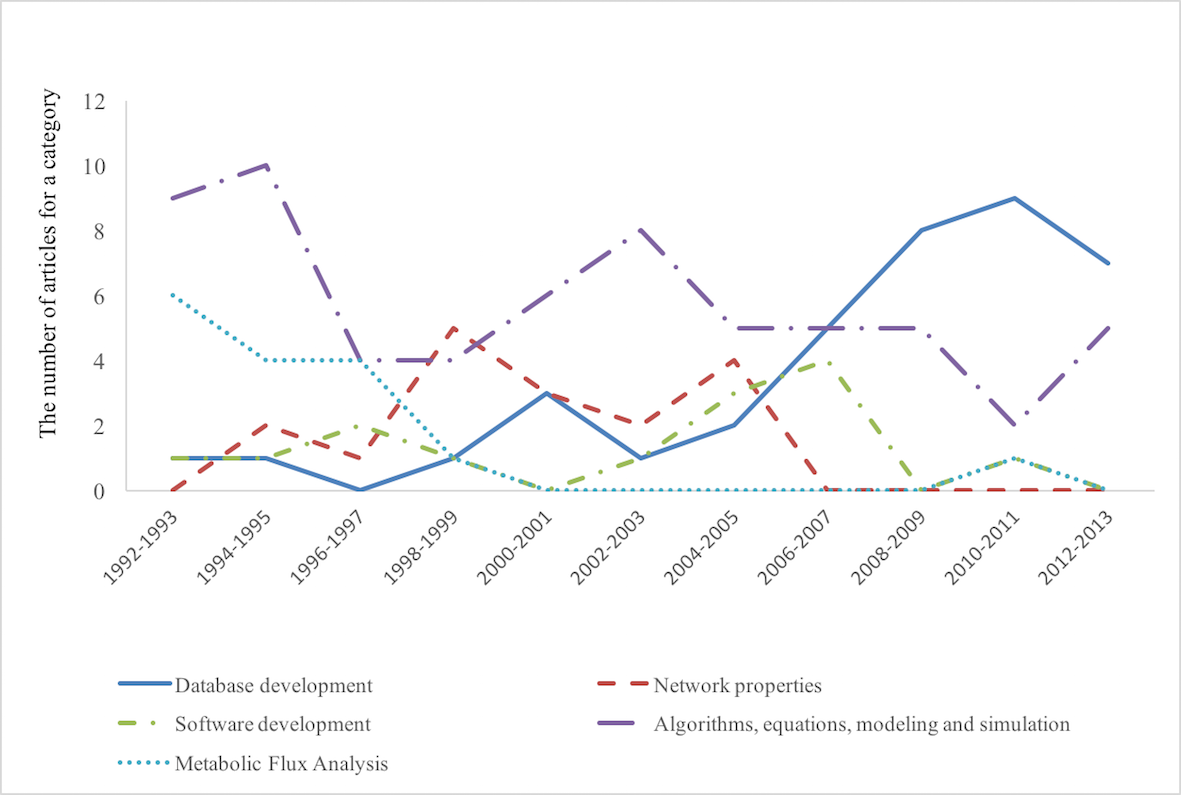
Shows trends in systems biology research by presenting the number of articles out of the top 30 cited systems biology papers during that time which include a specific topic

Holism vs. Reductionism

It is challenging to trace the origins and beginnings of systems biology. A comprehensive perspective on the human body was central to the medical practices of Greek, Roman, and East Asian traditions, where physicians and thinkers like Hippocrates believed that health and illness were linked to the equilibrium or disruption of bodily fluids known as humors. This holistic perspective persisted in the Western world throughout the 19th and 20th centuries, with prominent physiologists viewing the body as controlled by various systems, including the nervous system, the gastrointestinal system, and the cardiovascular system. In the latter half of the 20th century, however, this way of thinking was largely supplanted by reductionism: To grasp how the body functions properly, one needed to comprehend the role of each component, from tissues and cells to the complete set of intracellular molecular building blocks.

In the 17th century, the triumphs of physics and the advancement of mechanical clockwork prompted a reductionist viewpoint in biology, interpreting organisms as intricate machines made up of simpler elements.

Jan Smuts (1870–1950), naturalist/philosopher and twice Prime Minister of South Africa, coined the commonly used term holism. Whole systems such as cells, tissues, organisms, and populations were proposed to have unique (emergent) properties. It was impossible to try and reassemble the behavior of the whole from the properties of the individual components, and new technologies were necessary to define and understand the behavior of systems.

Even though reductionism and holism are often contrasted with one another, they can be synthesized. One must understand how organisms are built (reductionism), while it is just as important to understand why they are so arranged (systems; holism). Each provides useful insights and answers different questions. However, the study of biological systems requires knowledge about control and design paradigms, as well as principles of structural stability, resilience, and robustness that are not directly inferred from mechanistic information. More profound insight will be gained by employing computer modeling to overcome the complexity in biological systems.

Nevertheless, this perspective was consistently balanced by thinkers who underscored the significance of organization and emergent traits in living systems. This reductionist perspective has achieved widespread acceptance, and our understanding of biological processes has expanded at a significant pace. However, alongside these advancements, scientific consensus gradually recognized that possessing complete information about molecular components alone would not suffice to elucidate the workings of life: the individual components rarely illustrate the function of a complex system. It is now commonly recognized that we need approaches for reconstructing integrated systems from their constituent parts and processes if we are to comprehend biological phenomena and manipulate them in a thoughtful, focused way.

Origin of systems biology as a field

In 1968, the term "systems biology" was first introduced at a conference. Those within the discipline soon recognized—and this understanding gradually became known to the wider public—that computational approaches were necessary to fully articulate the concepts and potential of systems biology. Specifically, these techniques needed to view biological phenomena as complex, multi-layered, adaptive, and dynamic systems. They had to account for transformations and intricate nonlinearities, thereby allowing for the smooth integration of smaller models ("modules") into larger, well-organized assemblies of models within complex settings. It became clear that mathematics and computation were vital for these methods. An acceleration of systems understanding came with the publication of the first ground-breaking text compiling molecular, physiological, and anatomical individuality in animals, which has been described as a revolution.

Initially, the wider scientific community was reluctant to accept the integration of computational methods and control theory in the exploration of living systems, believing that "biology was too complex to apply mathematics." However, as the new millennium neared, this viewpoint underwent a significant and lasting transformation. More scientists started working on integration of mathematical concepts to understand and solve biological problems. Now, systems biology has been widely applied in several fields including agriculture and medicine.

== Approaches to systems biology ==
=== Top-down approach ===
Top-down systems biology identifies molecular interaction networks by analyzing the correlated behaviors observed in large-scale 'omics' studies. With the advent of 'omics', this top-down strategy has become a leading approach. It begins with an overarching perspective of the system's behavior – examining everything at once – by gathering genome-wide experimental data and seeks to unveil and understand biological mechanisms at a more granular level – specifically, the individual components and their interactions. In this framework of 'top-down' systems biology, the primary goal is to uncover novel molecular mechanisms through a cyclical process that initiates with experimental data, transitions into data analysis and integration to identify correlations among molecule concentrations and concludes with the development of hypotheses regarding the co- and inter-regulation of molecular groups. These hypotheses then generate new predictions of correlations, which can be explored in subsequent experiments or through additional biochemical investigations. The notable advantages of top-down systems biology lie in its potential to provide comprehensive (i.e., genome-wide) insights and its focus on the metabolome, fluxome, transcriptome, and/or proteome. Top-down methods prioritize overall system states as influencing factors in models and the computational (or optimality) principles that govern the dynamics of the global system. For instance, while the dynamics of motor control (neuro) emerge from the interactions of millions of neurons, one can also characterize the neural motor system as a sort of feedback control system, which directs a 'plant' (the body) and guides movement by minimizing 'cost functions' (e.g., achieving trajectories with minimal jerk).

=== Bottom-up approach ===
Bottom-up systems biology infers the functional characteristics that may arise from a subsystem characterized with a high degree of mechanistic detail using molecular techniques. This approach begins with the foundational elements by developing the interactive behavior (rate equation) of each component process (e.g., enzymatic processes) within a manageable portion of the system. It examines the mechanisms through which functional properties arise in the interactions of known components. Subsequently, these formulations are combined to understand the behavior of the system. The primary goal of this method is to integrate the pathway models into a comprehensive model representing the entire system - the top or whole. As research and understanding advance, these models are often expanded by incorporating additional processes with high mechanistic detail.

The bottom-up approach facilitates the integration and translation of drug-specific in vitro findings to the in vivo human context. This encompasses data collected during the early phases of drug development, such as safety evaluations. When assessing cardiac safety, a purely bottom-up modeling and simulation method entails reconstructing the processes that determine exposure, which includes the plasma (or heart tissue) concentration-time profiles and their electrophysiological implications, ideally incorporating hemodynamic effects and changes in contractility. Achieving this necessitates various models, ranging from single-cell to advanced three-dimensional (3D) multiphase models. Information from multiple in vitro systems that serve as stand-ins for the in vivo absorption, distribution, metabolism, and excretion (ADME) processes enables predictions of drug exposure, while in vitro data on drug-ion channel interactions support the translation of exposure to body surface potentials and the calculation of important electrophysiological endpoints. The separation of data related to the drug, system, and trial design, which is characteristic of the bottom-up approach, allows for predictions of exposure-response relationships considering both inter- and intra-individual variability, making it a valuable tool for evaluating drug effects at a population level. Numerous successful instances of applying physiologically based pharmacokinetic (PBPK) modeling in drug discovery and development have been documented in the literature.

== Associated disciplines ==
Overview of signal transduction pathways

According to the interpretation of systems biology as using large data sets using interdisciplinary tools, a typical application is metabolomics, which is the complete set of all the metabolic products, metabolites, in the system at the organism, cell, or tissue level.

Items that may be a computer database include: phenomics, organismal variation in phenotype as it changes during its life span; genomics, organismal deoxyribonucleic acid (DNA) sequence, including intra-organismal cell specific variation. (i.e., telomere length variation); epigenomics/epigenetics, organismal and corresponding cell specific transcriptomic regulating factors not empirically coded in the genomic sequence. (i.e., DNA methylation, Histone acetylation and deacetylation, etc.); transcriptomics, organismal, tissue or whole cell gene expression measurements by DNA microarrays or serial analysis of gene expression; interferomics, organismal, tissue, or cell-level transcript correcting factors (i.e., RNA interference), proteomics, organismal, tissue, or cell level measurements of proteins and peptides via two-dimensional gel electrophoresis, mass spectrometry or multi-dimensional protein identification techniques (advanced HPLC systems coupled with mass spectrometry). Sub disciplines include phosphoproteomics, glycoproteomics and other methods to detect chemically modified proteins; glycomics, organismal, tissue, or cell-level measurements of carbohydrates; lipidomics, organismal, tissue, or cell level measurements of lipids.

The molecular interactions within the cell are also studied, this is called interactomics. A discipline in this field of study is protein–protein interactions, although interactomics includes the interactions of other molecules. Neuroelectrodynamics, where the computer's or a brain's computing function as a dynamic system is studied along with its (bio)physical mechanisms; and fluxomics, measurements of the rates of metabolic reactions in a biological system (cell, tissue, or organism).

In approaching a systems biology problem there are two main approaches. These are the top down and bottom up approach. The top down approach takes as much of the system into account as possible and relies largely on experimental results. The RNA-Seq technique is an example of an experimental top down approach. Conversely, the bottom up approach is used to create detailed models while also incorporating experimental data. An example of the bottom up approach is the use of circuit models to describe a simple gene network.

Various technologies utilized to capture dynamic changes in mRNA, proteins, and post-translational modifications. Mechanobiology, forces and physical properties at all scales, their interplay with other regulatory mechanisms; biosemiotics, analysis of the system of sign relations of an organism or other biosystems; Physiomics, a systematic study of physiome in biology.

Cancer systems biology is an example of the systems biology approach, which can be distinguished by the specific object of study (tumorigenesis and treatment of cancer). It works with the specific data (patient samples, high-throughput data with particular attention to characterizing cancer genome in patient tumour samples) and tools (immortalized cancer cell lines, mouse models of tumorigenesis, xenograft models, high-throughput sequencing methods, siRNA-based gene knocking down high-throughput screenings, computational modeling of the consequences of somatic mutations and genome instability). The long-term objective of the systems biology of cancer is ability to better diagnose cancer, classify it and better predict the outcome of a suggested treatment, which is a basis for personalized cancer medicine and virtual cancer patient in more distant prospective. Significant efforts in computational systems biology of cancer have been made in creating realistic multi-scale in silico models of various tumours.

The systems biology approach often involves the development of mechanistic models, such as the reconstruction of dynamic systems from the quantitative properties of their elementary building blocks. For instance, a cellular network can be modelled mathematically using methods coming from chemical kinetics and control theory. Due to the large number of parameters, variables and constraints in cellular networks, numerical and computational techniques are often used (e.g., flux balance analysis).

Other aspects of computer science, informatics, and statistics are also used in systems biology. These include new forms of computational models, such as the use of process calculi to model biological processes (notable approaches include stochastic π-calculus, BioAmbients, Beta Binders, BioPEPA, and Brane calculus) and constraint-based modeling; integration of information from the literature, using techniques of information extraction and text mining; development of online databases and repositories for sharing data and models, approaches to database integration and software interoperability via loose coupling of software, websites and databases, or commercial suits; network-based approaches for analyzing high dimensional genomic data sets. For example, weighted correlation network analysis is often used for identifying clusters (referred to as modules), modeling the relationship between clusters, calculating fuzzy measures of cluster (module) membership, identifying intramodular hubs, and for studying cluster preservation in other data sets; pathway-based methods for omics data analysis, e.g. approaches to identify and score pathways with differential activity of their gene, protein, or metabolite members. Much of the analysis of genomic data sets also include identifying correlations. Additionally, as much of the information comes from different fields, the development of syntactically and semantically sound ways of representing biological models is needed.

== Model and its types ==
=== Definition ===
A model serves as a conceptual depiction of objects or processes, highlighting certain characteristics of these items or activities. A model captures only certain facets of reality; however, when created correctly, this limited scope is adequate because the primary goal of modeling is to address specific inquiries. The saying, "essentially, all models are wrong, but some are useful," attributed to the statistician George Box, is a suitable principle for constructing models.

=== Types of models ===
- Boolean Models: These models are also known as logical models and represent biological systems using binary states, allowing for the analysis of gene regulatory networks and signaling pathways. They are advantageous for their simplicity and ability to capture qualitative behaviors.
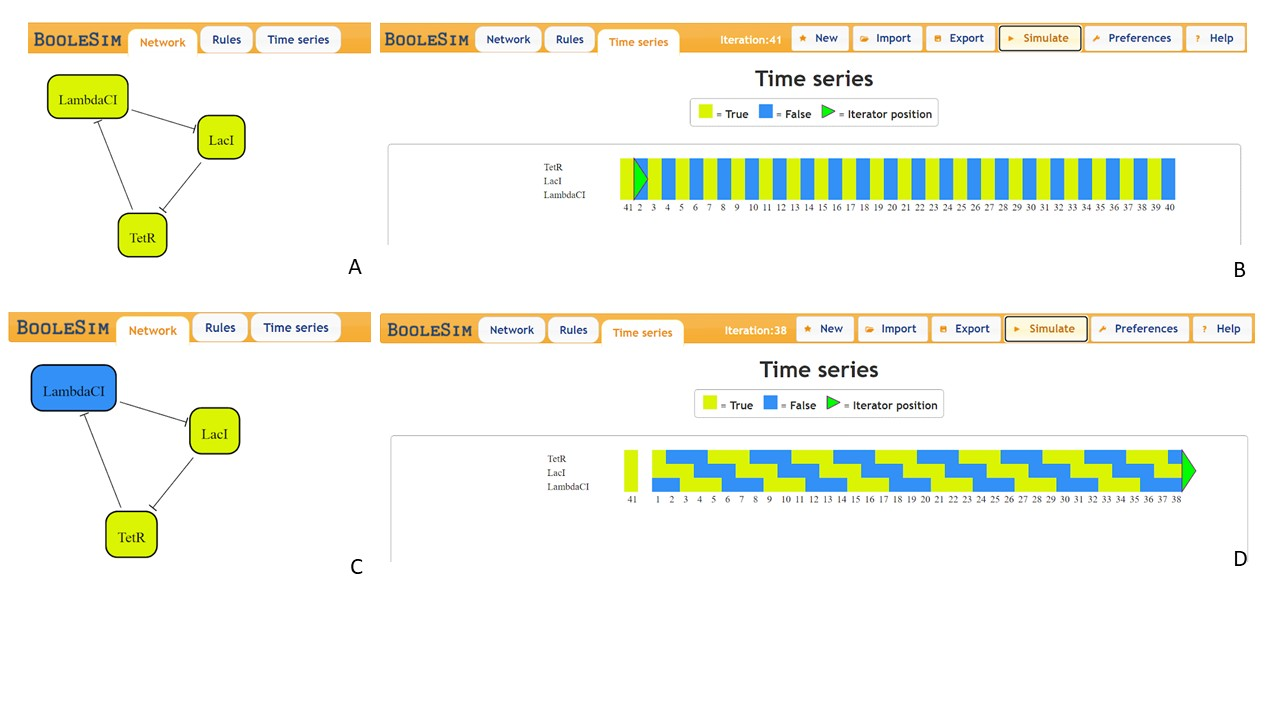
  This figure deals with the tool BooleSim which is used for simulating and manipulating Boolean models. The given figure deals with a simple synthetic repressilator (A&C) and the concerned output (time series) is obtained using the tool BooleSim (B & D). The boxes represent nodes and the arrow shows the relationship between them. Pointed and blunt arrows indicate promotion and repression of the gene. Yellow coloured boxes indicate the switched on status of the gene and blue colour denotes its switched off state.
- Petri nets (PN): A unique type of bipartite graph consisting of two types of nodes: places and transitions. When a transition is activated, a token is transferred from the input places to the output places; the process is asynchronous and non-deterministic.
- Polynomial dynamical systems (PDS)- An algebraically based approach that represents a specific type of sequential FDS (Finite Dynamical System) operating over a finite field. Each transition function is an element within a polynomial ring defined over the finite field. It employs advanced rapid techniques from computer algebra and computational algebraic geometry, originating from the Buchberger algorithm, to compute the Gröbner bases of ideals in these rings. An ideal consists of a set of polynomials that remain closed under polynomial combinations.
- Differential equation models (ODE and PDE)- Ordinary Differential Equations (ODEs) are commonly utilized to represent the temporal dynamics of networks, while Partial Differential Equations (PDEs) are employed to describe behaviors occurring in both space and time, enabling the modeling of pattern formation. These spatiotemporal Diffusion-Reaction Systems demonstrate the emergence of self-organizing patterns, typically articulated by the general local activity principle, which elucidates the factors contributing to complexity and self-organization observed in nature.
- Bayesian models: This kind of model is commonly referred to as dynamic models. It utilizes a probabilistic approach that enables the integration of prior knowledge through Bayes' Theorem. A challenge can arise when determining the direction of an interaction.
- Finite State Linear Model (FSML): This model integrates continuous variables (such as protein concentration) with discrete elements (like promoter regions that have a limited number of states) in modeling.
- Agent-based models (ABM): Initially created within the fields of social sciences and economics, it models the behavior of individual agents (such as genes, mRNAs (siRNA, miRNA, lncRNA), proteins, and transcription factors) and examines how their interactions influence the larger system, which in this case is the cell.
- Rule – based models: In this approach, molecular interactions are simulated using local rules that can be utilized even in the absence of a specific network structure, meaning that the step to infer the network is not required, allowing these network-free methods to avoid the complex challenges associated with network inference.
- Piecewise-linear differential equation models (PLDE): The model is composed of a piecewise-linear representation of differential equations using step functions, along with a collection of inequality restrictions for the parameter values.

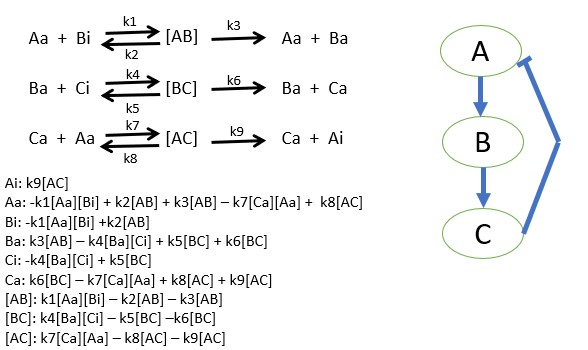
A simple three protein negative feedback loop modeled with mass action kinetic differential equations. Each protein interaction is described by a Michaelis–Menten reaction.

- Stochastic models: Models utilizing the Gillespie algorithm for addressing the chemical master equation provide the likelihood that a particular molecular species will possess a defined molecular population or concentration at a specified future point in time. The Gillespie method is the most computationally intensive option available. In cases where the number of molecules is low or when modeling the effects of molecular crowding is desired, the stochastic approach is preferred.
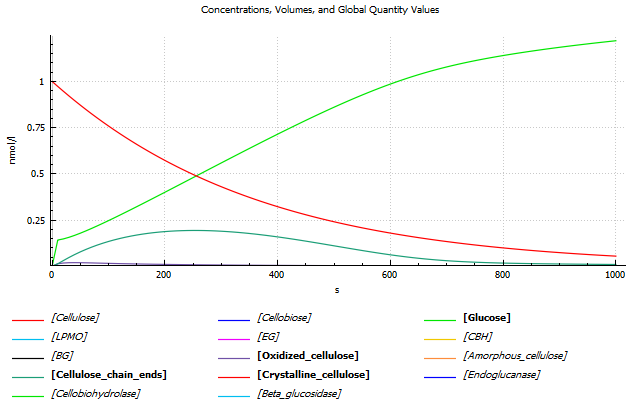
  The graph demonstrates the enzymatic conversion of cellulose to glucose over time where red line denoted cellulose and green line denotes glucose, with key enzymes facilitating the process and their concentrations changing as the reaction progresses (Time course run in COPASI). This is a typical kinetic profile for a multi-enzyme hydrolysis system.
- State Space Model (SSM): Linear or non-linear modeling techniques that utilize an abstract state space along with various algorithms, which include Bayesian and other statistical methods, autoregressive models, and Kalman filtering.

=== Creating biological models ===
Researchers begin by choosing a biological pathway and diagramming all of the protein, gene, and/or metabolic pathways. After determining all of the interactions, mass action kinetics or enzyme kinetic rate laws are used to describe the speed of the reactions in the system. Using mass-conservation, the differential equations for the biological system can be constructed. Experiments or parameter fitting can be done to determine the parameter values to use in the differential equations. These parameter values will be the various kinetic constants required to fully describe the model. This model determines the behavior of species in biological systems and bring new insight to the specific activities of systems. Sometimes it is not possible to gather all reaction rates of a system. Unknown reaction rates are determined by simulating the model of known parameters and target behavior which provides possible parameter values.

The use of constraint-based reconstruction and analysis (COBRA) methods has become popular among systems biologists to simulate and predict the metabolic phenotypes, using genome-scale models. One of the methods is the flux balance analysis (FBA) approach, by which one can study the biochemical networks and analyze the flow of metabolites through a particular metabolic network, by optimizing the objective function of interest (e.g. maximizing biomass production to predict growth).

== Applications in system biology ==
Systems biology, an interdisciplinary field that combines biology, data analysis, and mathematical modeling, has revolutionized various sectors, including medicine, agriculture, and environmental science. By integrating omics data (genomics, proteomics, metabolomics, etc.), systems biology provides a holistic understanding of complex biological systems, enabling advancements in drug discovery, crop improvement, and environmental impact assessment. This response explores the applications of systems biology across these domains, highlighting both industrial and academic research contributions. System biology is used in agriculture to identify the genetic and metabolic components of complex characteristics through trait dissection. It aids in the comprehension of plant-pathogen interactions in disease resistance. It is utilized in nutritional quality to enhance nutritional content through metabolic engineering.

=== Cancer ===
Approaches to cancer systems biology have made it possible to effectively combine experimental data with computer algorithms and, as an exception, to apply actionable targeted medicines for the treatment of cancer. In order to apply innovative cancer systems biology techniques and boost their effectiveness for customizing new, individualized cancer treatment modalities, comprehensive multi-omics data acquired through the sequencing of tumor samples and experimental model systems will be crucial.

Cancer systems biology has the potential to provide insights into intratumor heterogeneity and identify therapeutic options. In particular, enhanced cancer systems biology methods that incorporate not only multi-omics data from tumors, but also extensive experimental models derived from patients can assist clinicians in their decision-making processes, ultimately aiming to address treatment failures in cancer.

=== Drug development ===
Before the 1990s, phenotypic drug discovery formed the foundation of most research in drug discovery, utilizing cellular and animal disease models to find drugs without focusing on a specific molecular target. However, following the completion of the human genome project, target-based drug discovery has become the predominant approach in contemporary pharmaceutical research for various reasons. Gene knockout and transgenic models enable researchers to investigate and gain insights into the function of targets and the mechanisms by which drugs operate on a molecular level. Target-based assays lend themselves better to high-throughput screening, which simplifies the process of identifying second-generation drugs—those that improve upon first-in-class drugs in aspects such as potency, selectivity, and half-life, especially when combined with structure-based drug design. To do this, researchers utilize the three-dimensional structure of target proteins and computational models of interactions between small molecules and those targets to aid in the identification of superior compounds.

=== Food safety and quality ===
The multi-omics technologies in system biology can be also be used in aspects of food quality and safety. High-throughput omics techniques, including genomics, proteomics, and metabolomics, offer valuable insights into the molecular composition of food products, facilitating the identification of critical elements that affect food quality and safety. For example, integrating omics data can enhance the understanding of the metabolic pathways and associated functional gene patterns that contribute to both the nutritional value and safety of food crops. This comprehensive approach guarantees the creation of food products that are both nutritious and safe, capable of satisfying the increasing global demand.

Environmental system biology

Genomics examines all genes as an evolving system over time, aiming to understand their interactions and effects on biological pathways, networks, and physiology in a broader context compared to genetics. As a result, genomics holds significant potential for discovering clusters of genes associated with complex disorders, aiding in the comprehension and management of diseases induced by environmental factors.

When exploring the interactions between the environment and the genome as contributors to complex diseases, it is clear that the genome itself cannot be altered for the time being. However, once these interactions are recognized, it is feasible to minimize exposure or adjust lifestyle factors related to the environmental aspect of the disease. Gene-environment interactions can occur through direct associations with active metabolites at certain locations within the genome, potentially leading to mutations that could cause human diseases. Indirect interactions with the human genome can take place through intracellular receptors that function as ligand-activated transcription factors, which modulate gene expression and maintain cellular balance, or with an environmental factor that may produce detrimental effects. This type of environmental-gene interaction could be more straightforward to investigate than direct interactions since there are numerous markers of this kind of interaction that are readily measurable before the disease manifests. Examples of this include the expression of cytochrome P450 genes following exposure to environmental substances, such as the polycyclic aromatic hydrocarbon benzo[a]pyrene, which binds to the Ah receptor.

== Technical challenges ==
One of the main challenges in systems biology is the connection between experimental descriptions, observations, data, models, and the assumptions that stem from them. In essence, systems biology must be understood within an information management framework that significantly encompasses experimental life sciences. Models are created using various languages or representation schemes, each suitable for conveying and reasoning about distinct sets of characteristics. There is no single universal language for systems biology that can adequately cover the diverse phenomena we aim to investigate. However, this intricate scenario overlooks two important aspects. Models can be developed in multiple versions over time and by different research teams. Conflicts can occur, and observations may be disputed. Various researchers might produce models in different versions and configurations. The unpredictable elements suggest that systems biology is not likely to yield a definitive collection of established models. Instead, we can expect a rich ecosystem of models to develop within a structure that fosters discussion and cooperation among participants. Challenges also exist in verifying the constraints and creating modeling frameworks with robust compositional strategies. This may create a need to handle models that may conflict with one another, whether between schemes or across different scales. In the end, the goal could involve the creation of personalized models that reflect differences in physiology, as opposed to universal models of biological processes.

Other challenges include the massive amount of data created by high-throughput omics technologies which presents considerable challenges in terms of computation and storage. Each analysis in omics can result in data files ranging from terabytes to petabytes, which requires strong computational systems and ample storage solutions to manage and process these datasets effectively. The computational requirements are made more difficult by the necessity for advanced algorithms that can integrate and analyze diverse, high-dimensional data. Approaches like deep learning and network-based methods have displayed potential in tackling these issues, but they also demand significant computational power.

== Artificial intelligence (AI) in systems biology ==
Utilizing AI in Systems Biology enables scientists to uncover novel insights into the intricate relationships present within biological systems, such as those among genes, proteins, and cells. A significant focus within Systems Biology is the application of AI for the analysis of expansive and complex datasets, including multi-omics data produced by high-throughput methods like next-generation sequencing and proteomics. Approaches powered by AI can be employed to detect patterns and correlations within these datasets and to anticipate the behavior of biological systems under varying conditions.

For instance, artificial intelligence can identify genes that are expressed differently across various cancer types or detect small molecules linked to particular disease states. A key difficulty in analyzing multi-omics data is the integration of information from multiple sources. AI can create integrative models that consider the intricate interactions between different types of molecular data. These models may be utilized to uncover new biomarkers or therapeutic targets for diseases, as well as to enhance our understanding of fundamental biological processes. By significantly speeding up our comprehension of complex biological systems, AI has the potential to lead to new treatments and therapies for a range of diseases.

Structural systems biology is a multidisciplinary field that merges systems biology with structural biology to investigate biological systems at the molecular scale. This domain strives for a thorough understanding of how biological molecules interact and function within cells, tissues, and organisms. The integration of AI in structural systems biology has become increasingly vital for examining extensive and complex datasets and modeling the behavior of biological systems. AI facilitates the analysis of protein–protein interaction networks within structural systems biology. These networks can be explored using graph theory and various mathematical methods, uncovering key characteristics such as hubs and modules. AI can also assist in the discovery of new drugs or therapies by predicting the effect of a drug on a particular biological component or pathway.

== See also ==
- Biochemical systems equation
- BioSystems (journal)
- Cellular model
- Computational systems biology
- Interactome
- List of omics topics in biology
- List of systems biology modeling software
- Metabolic Control Analysis
- Metabolic network modelling
- Modelling biological systems
- Network biology
- Metabolic network
- SBML

== Sources ==
- Turing, Alan M. (14 August 1952). "The Chemical Basis of Morphogenesis". Philosophical Transactions of the Royal Society of London B. 237 (641): 37–72. Bibcode:1952RSPTB.237...37T. doi:10.1098/rstb.1952.0012. S2CID 937133.
- Snoep, Jacky L; Westerhoff, Hans V (2005). "From isolation to integration, a systems biology approach for building the Silicon Cell". In Alberghina, Lilia; Westerhoff, Hans V (eds.). Systems Biology: Definitions and Perspectives. Topics in Current Genetics. Vol. 13. Berlin: Springer-Verlag. pp. 13–30. doi:10.1007/b106456. ISBN 978-3-540-22968-1.
- "Systems Biology: the 21st Century Science". Institute for Systems Biology.
- Zeng BJ., On the concept of systems biological engineering, Nov. 1994, Communication on Transgenic Animals, CAS, China.
- Sauer, Uwe; Heinemann, Matthias; Zamboni, Nicola (27 April 2007). "Genetics: Getting Closer to the Whole Picture". Science. 316 (5824): 550–551. Bibcode:2007Sci...316..550S. doi:10.1126/science.1142502. PMID 17463274. S2CID 42448991.
- Noble, Denis (2006). The music of life: Biology beyond the genome. Oxford: Oxford University Press. p. 176. ISBN 978-0-19-929573-9.
- Kholodenko, Boris N; Sauro, Herbert M (2005). "Mechanistic and modular approaches to modeling and inference of cellular regulatory networks". In Alberghina, Lilia; Westerhoff, Hans V (eds.). Systems Biology: Definitions and Perspectives. Topics in Current Genetics. Vol. 13. Berlin: Springer-Verlag. pp. 357–451. doi:10.1007/b136809. ISBN 978-3-540-22968-1.
- Chiara Romualdi; Gerolamo Lanfranchi (2009). "Statistical Tools for Gene Expression Analysis and Systems Biology and Related Web Resources". In Stephen Krawetz (ed.). Bioinformatics for Systems Biology (2nd ed.). Humana Press. pp. 181–205. doi:10.1007/978-1-59745-440-7_11. ISBN 978-1-59745-440-7.
- Mesarovic, Mihajlo D. (1968). Systems Theory and Biology. Berlin: Springer-Verlag.
- Rosen, Robert (5 July 1968). "A Means Toward a New Holism". Science. 161 (3836): 34–35. Bibcode:1968Sci...161...34M. doi:10.1126/science.161.3836.34. JSTOR 1724368.
- Kling, Jim (3 March 2006). "Working the Systems". Science.
- Gardner, Timothy .S; di Bernardo, Diego; Lorenz, David; Collins, James J. (4 July 2003). "Inferring Genetic Networks and Identifying Compound Mode of Action via Expression Profiling". Science. 301 (5629): 102–105. Bibcode:2003Sci...301..102G. doi:10.1126/science.1081900. PMID 12843395. S2CID 8356492.
- di Bernardo, Diego; Thompson, Michael J.; Gardner, Timothy S.; Chobot, Sarah E.; Eastwood, Erin L.; Wojtovich, Andrew P.; Elliott, Sean J.; Schaus, Scott E.; Collins, James J. (March 2005). "Chemogenomic profiling on a genome-wide scale using reverse-engineered gene networks". Nature Biotechnology. 23 (3): 377–383. doi:10.1038/nbt1075. PMID 15765094. S2CID 16270018.
- Hunter, Philip (May 2012). "Back down to Earth: Even if it has not yet lived up to its promises, systems biology has now matured and is about to deliver its first results". EMBO Reports. 13 (5): 408–411. doi:10.1038/embor.2012.49. PMC 3343359. PMID 22491028.
