= Bifurcation memory =

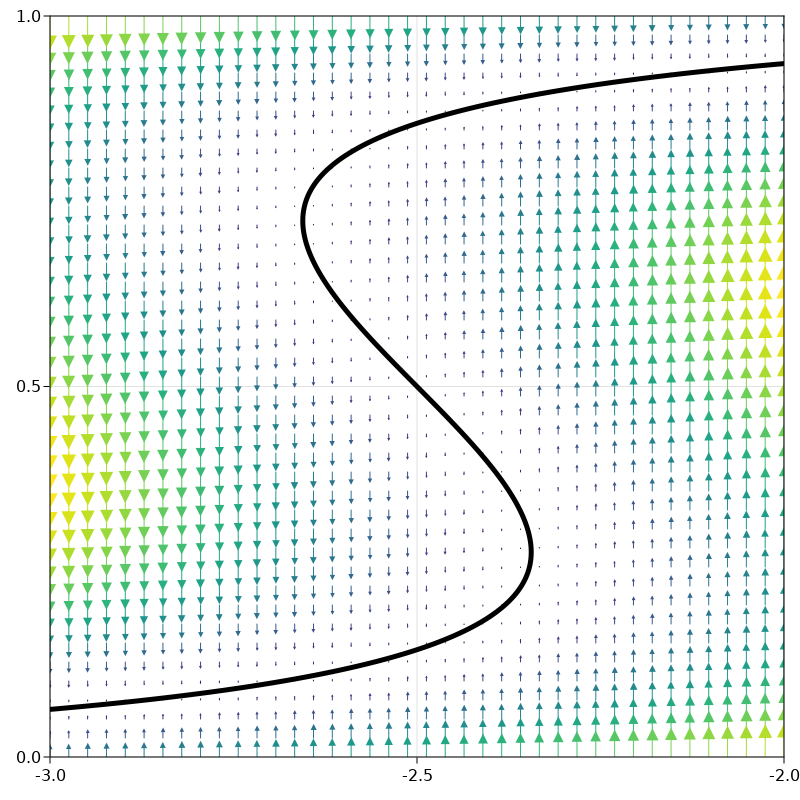
Bifurcation diagram of the one-neuron recurrent network. Horizontal axis is b, and vertical axis is x. The black curve is the set of stable and unstable equilibria. Notice that the system exhibits hysteresis, and can be used as a one-bit memory.

Bifurcation memory is a generalized name for some specific features of the behaviour of the dynamical system near the bifurcation. An example is the recurrent neuron memory.

== General information ==
The phenomenon is known also under the names of "stability loss delay for dynamical bifurcations" and "ghost attractor".

The essence of the effect of bifurcation memory lies in the appearance of a special type of transition process. An ordinary transition process is characterized by asymptotic approach of the dynamical system from the state defined by its initial conditions to the state corresponding to its stable stationary regime in the basin of attraction of which the system found itself. However, near the bifurcation boundary can be observed two types of transition processes: passing through the place of the vanished stationary regime, the dynamic system slows down its asymptotic motion temporarily, "as if recollecting the defunct orbit", with the number of revolutions of the phase trajectory in this area of bifurcation memory depending on proximity of the corresponding parameter of the system to its bifurcation value, — and only then the phase trajectory rushes to the state that corresponds to stable stationary regime of the system.

Bifurcation situations generate in state space bifurcation tracks that isolate regions of unusual transition processes (phase spots). The transition process in the phase spot is estimated qualitatively as a universal dependence of the index of loss of controllability on the control parameter.

— Feigin, 2004,

In the literature, the effect of bifurcation memory is associated with a dangerous "bifurcation of merging".

The twice repeated bifurcation memory effects in dynamical systems were also described in literature; they were observed, when parameters of the dynamical system under consideration were chosen in the area of either crossing two different bifurcation boundaries, or their close neighbourhood.

== The known definitions ==
It is claimed that the term "bifurcation memory":

...was proposed in Ref. to describe the fact that solutions of a system of differential equations (when the boundary of the region in which they exist is crossed in the parameter space) retain similarity with the already nonexistent type of solutions as long as the variable parameter values insignificantly differ from the limit value.
In mathematical models describing processes in time, this fact is known as a corollary of the theorem on continuous dependence of solutions of differential equations (on a finite time interval) on their parameters; from this standpoint, it is not fundamentally new. (Note: The theorem on the continuous dependence of solutions of differential equations has not yet been proven for the general case of infinite systems of differential equations. In this sense, the thought stated in the quotation above should be still understood, hence, only as a believable hypothesis.)

— Ataullakhanov et al., 2007,

== History of studying ==
The earliest of those described on this subject in the scientific literature should be recognized, perhaps, the result presented in 1973, which was obtained under the guidance of L. S. Pontryagin, a Soviet academician, and which initiated then a number of foreign studies of the mathematical problem known as "stability loss delay for dynamical bifurcations".

A new wave of interest in the study of the strange behaviour of dynamic systems in a certain region of the state space has been caused by the desire to explain the non-linear effects revealed during the getting out of controllability of ships.

Subsequently, similar phenomena were also found in biological systems — in the system of blood coagulation and in one of the mathematical models of myocardium.

== Topicality ==
The topicality of scientific studies of the bifurcation memory is obviously driven by the desire to prevent conditions of reduced controllability of the vehicle.

In addition, the special sort of tachycardias connected with the effects of bifurcation memory are considered in cardiophysics.

== See also ==
- Bifurcation (disambiguation)
- Bifurcation diagram
- Bifurcation theory
- Phase portrait
- Rulkov map
- FitzHugh-Nagumo model
