= Physiome =

Wholistic physiological dynamics of an organism

The physiome of an individual's or species' physiological state is the description of its functional behavior. The physiome describes the physiological dynamics of the normal intact organism and is built upon information and structure (genome, proteome, and morphome). The term comes from "physio-" (nature) and "-ome" (as a whole). The study of physiome is called physiomics.

The concept of a physiome project was presented to the International Union of Physiological Sciences (IUPS) by its Commission on Bioengineering in Physiology in 1993. A workshop on designing the Physiome Project was held in 1997. At its world congress in 2001, the IUPS designated the project as a major focus for the next decade. The project is led by the Physiome Commission of the IUPS.

Other research initiatives related to the physiome include:

- The EuroPhysiome Initiative
- The NSR Physiome Project of the National Simulation Resource (NSR) at the University of Washington, supporting the IUPS Physiome Project
- The Wellcome Trust Heart Physiome Project, a collaboration between the University of Auckland and the University of Oxford, part of the wider IUPS Physiome Project

== See also ==
- Cardiophysics
- Cytomics
- Human Genome Project
- List of omics topics in biology
- Living Human Project
- Virtual Physiological Human
- Virtual Physiological Rat
