= Virtual Physiological Rat =

Medical research simulation

The Virtual Physiological Rat (VPR) Project is an international collaboration aimed at simulating the integrated cardiovascular function of the rat and supported by the National Institute of General Medical Sciences as a National Center for Systems Biology. The project is motivated by the fact that, although there exist both a depth of knowledge of basic cardiovascular physiology and a host of physiological and genomic data from animal models of disease, there is a lack of understanding of how multiple genes and environmental factors interact to determine cardiovascular phenotype. The Virtual Physiological Rat Project is focused on developing computational tools to capture the underlying systems physiology as well as the pathophysiological perturbations associated with disease. These tools are being developed and validated based on experimental characterization of physiological function across a number of organ systems in rat strains engineered to show relevant disease phenotypes. Computer simulation is used to integrate disparate data (genomic, anatomic, physiological, etc.) to explain and predict function, and to translate the findings from animal models to yield new information on specific interrelated complex diseases in humans, including hypertension, kidney disease, heart failure, and metabolic syndrome.
