= Tongue bifurcation =

Tongue bifurcation may refer to:

- Tongue splitting, a type of body modification
- Forked tongue, a physical characteristic of certain animals
