= Virtual Physiological Human =

The Virtual Physiological Human (VPH) is a European initiative that focuses on a methodological and technological framework that, once established, will enable collaborative investigation of the human body as a single complex system. The collective framework will make it possible to share resources and observations formed by institutions and organizations, creating disparate but integrated computer models of the mechanical, physical and biochemical functions of a living human body.

VPH is a framework which aims to be descriptive, integrative and predictive. Clapworthy et al. state that the framework should be descriptive by allowing laboratory and healthcare observations around the world "to be collected, catalogued, organized, shared and combined in any possible way." It should be integrative by enabling those observations to be collaboratively analyzed by related professionals in order to create "systemic hypotheses." Finally, it should be predictive by encouraging interconnections between extensible and scalable predictive models and "systemic networks that solidify those systemic hypotheses" while allowing observational comparison.

The framework is formed by large collections of anatomical, physiological, and pathological data stored in digital format, typically by predictive simulations developed from these collections and by services intended to support researchers in the creation and maintenance of these models, as well as in the creation of end-user technologies to be used in the clinical practice. VPH models aim to integrate physiological processes across different length and time scales (multi-scale modelling). These models make possible the combination of patient-specific data with population-based representations. The objective is to develop a systemic approach which avoids a reductionist approach and seeks not to subdivide biological systems in any particular way by dimensional scale (body, organ, tissue, cells, molecules), by scientific discipline (biology, physiology, biophysics, biochemistry, molecular biology, bioengineering) or anatomical sub-system (cardiovascular, musculoskeletal, gastrointestinal, etc.).

== History ==
The initial concepts that led to the Virtual Physiological Human initiative came from the IUPS Physiome Project. The project was started in 1997 and represented the first worldwide effort to define the physiome through the development of databases and models which facilitated the understanding of the integrative function of cells, organs, and organisms. The project focused on compiling and providing a central repository of databases that would link experimental information and computational models from many laboratories into a single, self-consistent framework.

Following the launch of the Physiome Project, there were many other worldwide initiatives of loosely coupled actions all focusing on the development of methods for modelling and simulation of human pathophysiology. In 2005, an expert workshop of the Physiome was held as part of the Functional Imaging and Modelling of the Heart Conference in Barcelona where a white paper entitled Towards Virtual Physiological Human: Multilevel modelling and simulation of the human anatomy and physiology was presented. The goal of this paper was to shape a clear overview of on-going relevant VPH activities, to build a consensus on how they can be complemented by new initiatives for researchers in the EU and to identify possible mid-term and long term research challenges.

In 2006, the European Commission funded a coordination and support action entitled STEP: Structuring The EuroPhysiome. The STEP consortium promoted a significant consensus process that involved more than 300 stakeholders including researchers, industry experts, policy makers, clinicians, etc. The prime result of this process was a booklet entitled Seeding the EuroPhysiome: A Roadmap to the Virtual Physiological Human. The STEP action and the resulting research roadmap were instrumental in the development of the VHP concept and in the initiation of much larger process that involves significant research funding, large collaborative projects, and a number of connected initiatives, not only in Europe but also in the United States, Japan, and China.

VPH now forms a core target of the 7th Framework Programme of the European Commission, and aims to support the development of patient-specific computer models and their application in personalised and predictive healthcare. The Virtual Physiological Human Network of Excellence (VPH NoE) aims to connect the various VPH projects within the 7th Framework Programme.

== Goals of the initiative ==
VPH-related projects have received substantial funding from the European Commission in order to further scientific progress in this area. The European Commission is insistent that VPH-related projects demonstrate strong industrial participation and clearly indicate a route from basic science into clinical practice. In the future, it is hoped that the VPH will eventually lead to a better healthcare system which aims to produce the following benefits:

- personalized care solutions
- reduced need for experiments on animals
- more holistic approaches to medicine
- preventative approaches to treatment of disease

Personalized care solutions are a key aim of the VPH, with new modelling environments for predictive, individualized healthcare to result in better patient safety and drug efficacy. It is anticipated that the VPH could also result in healthcare improvement through greater understanding of pathophysiological processes. The use of biomedical data from a patient to simulate potential treatments and outcomes could prevent the patient from experiencing unnecessary or ineffective treatments. The use of in silico (by computer simulation) modelling and testing of drugs could also reduce the need for experiments on animals.

A future goal is that there also will be a more holistic approach to medicine with the body treated as a single multi-organ system rather than as a collection of individual organs. Advanced integrative tools should further help to improve the European healthcare system on a number of different levels that include diagnosis, treatment and care of patients and in particular quality of life.

== Projects ==
=== ImmunoGrid ===
ImmunoGrid is a project funded by the EU under Framework 6, to model and simulate the human immune system using grid computing at different physiological levels.

=== Osteoporotic Virtual Physiological Human ===
VPHOP (Osteoporotic Virtual Physiological Human) is a European Osteoporosis research project within the framework of the Virtual Physiological Human initiative. With current technology, osteoporotic fractures can be predicted with an accuracy of less than 70%. Better ways to prevent and diagnose osteoporotic fractures are needed.

Current fracture predictions are based on history and examination on the basis of which key factors are identified which contribute to the increased probability of an osteoporotic fracture. This approach oversimplifies the mechanisms leading to an osteoporotic fracture and fail to take into account numerous hierarchical factors which are unique to the individual. These factors range from cell-level to body-level functions. Musculoskeletal anatomy and neuromotor control define the daily loading spectrum, including paraphysiological overloading events. Fracture events occur at the organ level and are influenced by the elasticity and geometry of bone elasticity and geometry are determined by tissue morphology. Cell activity changes tissue morphology and composition over time. Constituents of the extracellular matrix are the prime determinants of tissue strength. Accuracy could be dramatically improved if a more deterministic approach was used that accounts for those factors and their variation between individuals.

The goal of the Osteoporotic Virtual Physiological Human is to improve the accuracy of these osteoporotic fracture prediction algorithms.

== See also ==
- Cytome
- EuroPhysiome
- Human anatomy
- Living Human Project
- Physiology
- Physiome
- Virtual Physiological Rat
- VPHOP (Osteoporotic Virtual Physiological Human)

== Bibliography ==
- Clapworthy, G., Kohl, P., Gregerson, H., Thomas, S., Viceconti, M., Hose, D., Pinney, D., Fenner, J., McCormack, K., Lawford, P., Van Sint Jan, S., Waters, S., & Coveney, P. 2007, "Digital Human Modelling: A Global Vision and a European Perspective," In Digital Human Modelling: A Global Vision and a European Perspective, Berlin: Springer, pp. 549–558.
- Hunter, P.J. 2006. Modeling living systems: the IUPS/EMBS Physiome project. Proceedings IEEE, 94, 678-991
- Viceconti, M., Testi, D., Taddei, F., Martelli, S., Clapworthy, G. J., Van Sint Jan, S., 2006. Biomechanics Modeling of the Musculoskeletal Apparatus: Status and Key Issues. Proceedings of the IEEE 94(4), 725-739.
