= Bifurcation diagram =

Visualization of sudden behavior changes caused by continuous parameter changes

In mathematics, particularly in dynamical systems, a bifurcation diagram shows the values visited or approached asymptotically (fixed points, periodic orbits, or chaotic attractors) of a system as a function of a bifurcation parameter in the system. It is usual to represent stable values with a solid line and unstable values with a dotted line, although often the unstable points are omitted. Bifurcation diagrams enable the visualization of bifurcation theory. In the context of discrete-time dynamical systems, the diagram is also called orbit diagram.

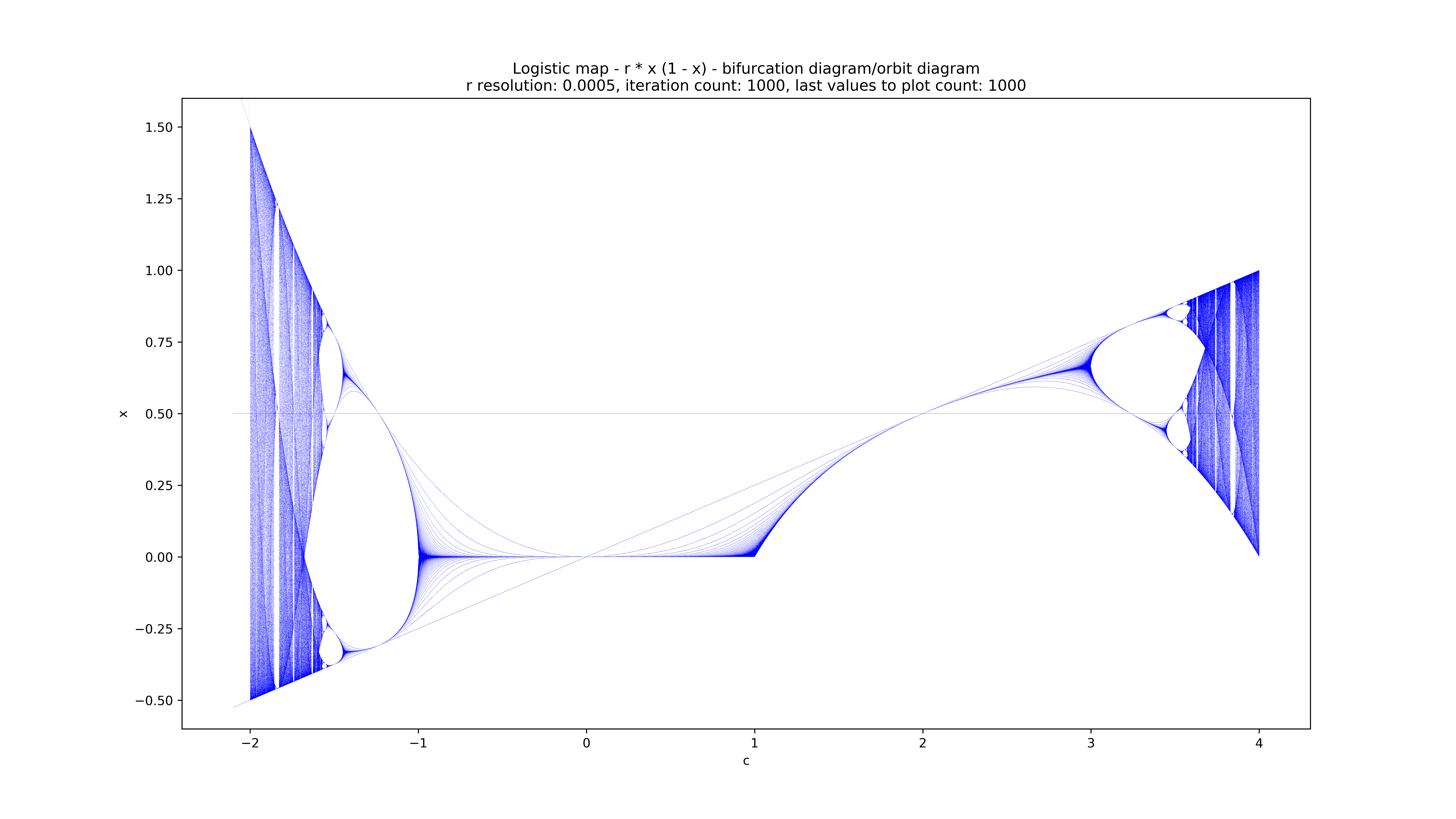
A bifurcation diagram of the logistic map

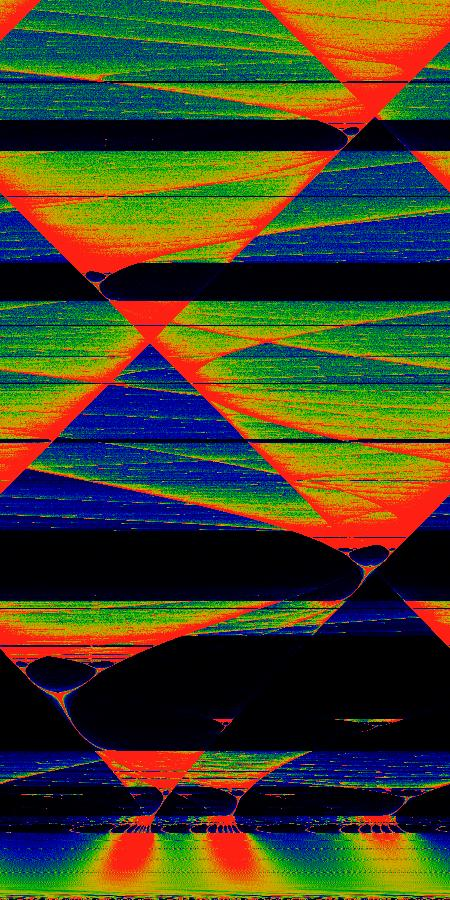
Bifurcation diagram of the circle map. Black regions correspond to Arnold tongues.

== Logistic map ==
Bifurcation diagram of the logistic map. The attractor for any value of the parameter r is shown on the vertical line at that r.

An example is the bifurcation diagram of the logistic map:
$$x_{n+1}=rx_n(1-x_n).$$

The bifurcation parameter r is shown on the horizontal axis of the plot and the vertical axis shows the set of values of the logistic function visited asymptotically from almost all initial conditions.

The bifurcation diagram shows the forking of the periods of stable orbits from 1 to 2 to 4 to 8 etc. Each of these bifurcation points is a period-doubling bifurcation. The ratio of the lengths of successive intervals between values of r for which bifurcation occurs converges to the first Feigenbaum constant.

The diagram also shows period doublings from 3 to 6 to 12 etc., from 5 to 10 to 20 etc., and so forth.

== Symmetry breaking in bifurcation sets ==
Symmetry breaking in pitchfork bifurcation as the parameter ε is varied. ε = 0 is the case of symmetric pitchfork bifurcation.

In a dynamical system such as
$$\ddot {x} + f(x;\mu) + \varepsilon g(x) = 0,$$
which is structurally stable when $\mu \neq 0$, if a bifurcation diagram is plotted, treating $\mu$ as the bifurcation parameter, but for different values of $\varepsilon$, the case $\varepsilon = 0$ is the symmetric pitchfork bifurcation. When $\varepsilon \neq 0$, we say we have a pitchfork with broken symmetry. This is illustrated in the animation on the right.

== Applications ==
Consider a system of differential equations that describes some physical quantity, that for concreteness could represent one of three examples: 1. the position and velocity of an undamped and frictionless pendulum, 2. a neuron's membrane potential over time, and 3. the average concentration of a virus in a patient's bloodstream. The differential equations for these examples include *parameters* that may affect the output of the equations. Changing the pendulum's length will affect its oscillation frequency, changing the magnitude of injected current into a neuron may transition the membrane potential from resting to spiking, and the long-term viral load in the bloodstream may decrease with carefully timed treatments.

In general, researchers may seek to quantify how the long-term (asymptotic) behavior of a system of differential equations changes if a parameter is changed. In the dynamical systems branch of mathematics, a bifurcation diagram quantifies these changes by showing how fixed points, periodic orbits, or chaotic attractors of a system change as a function of bifurcation parameter. Bifurcation diagrams are used to visualize these changes.

== See also ==
- Bifurcation memory
- Chaos theory
- Skeleton of bifurcation diagram
- Feigenbaum constants
- Sharkovskii's theorem
