= Cardiophysics =

Cardiophysics is an interdisciplinary science that stands at the junction of cardiology and medical physics, with researchers using the methods of, and theories from, physics to study cardiovascular system at different levels of its organisation, from the molecular scale to whole organisms. Being formed historically as part of systems biology, cardiophysics designed to reveal connections between the physical mechanisms, underlying the organization of the cardiovascular system, and biological features of its functioning.

Zbigniew R. Struzik seems to be a first author who used the term in a scientific publication in 2004.

One can use interchangeably also the terms cardiovascular physics.

== See also ==
- Medical physics
- Important publications in medical physics
- Biomedicine
- Biomedical engineering
- Physiome
- Nanomedicine
