= Spiral wave =

Spiral waves are travelling waves that rotate outward from a center in a spiral. They are a feature of many excitable media. Spiral waves have been observed in various biological systems including systems such as heart ventricular fibrillation, Dictyostelium cAMP waves, retinal spreading depression, Xenopus oocyte calcium waves, and glial calcium waves in cortical tissue culture.

Spiral Wave Dynamics in a Mathematical Model of Human Ventricular Tissue
