= Physiomics =

Physiomics is a systematic study of physiome in biology. Physiomics employs bioinformatics to construct networks of physiological features that are associated with genes, proteins and their networks. A few of the methods for determining individual relationships between the DNA sequence and physiological function include metabolic pathway engineering and RNAi analysis. The relationships derived from methods such as these are organized and processed computationally to form distinct networks. Computer models use these experimentally determined networks to develop further predictions of gene function.

== History ==
Physiomics arose from the imbalance between the amount of data being generated by genome projects and the technological ability to analyze the data on a large scale. As technologies such as high-throughput sequencing were being used to generate large amounts of genomic data, effective methods needed to be designed to experimentally interpret and computationally organize this data. Science can be illustrated as a cycle linking knowledge to observations. In the post-genomic era, the ability of computational methods to aid in this observation became evident. This cycle, aided by computer models, is the basis for bioinformatics and, thus, physiomics.

=== Physiome projects ===
In 1993, the International Union of Physiological Sciences (IUPS) in Australia presented a physiome project with the purpose of providing a quantitative description of physiological dynamics and functional behavior of the intact organism. The Physiome Project became a major focus of the IUPS in 2001. The National Simulation Resource Physiome Project is a North American project at The University of Washington. The key elements of the NSR Project are the databasing of physiological, pharmacological, and pathological information on humans and other organisms and integration through computational modeling. Other North American projects include the Biological Network Modeling Center at the California Institute of Technology, the National Center for Cell Analysis and Modeling at The University of Connecticut, and the NIH Center for Integrative Biomedical Computing at The University of Utah.

== Research applications ==
There are many different possible applications of physiomics, each requiring different computational models or the combined use of several different models. Examples of such applications include a three dimensional model for tumor growth, the modelling of biological pattern formation, a mathematical model for the formation of stretch marks in humans, and predictive algorithms for the growth of viral infections within insect hosts.

=== Modelling and simulation software ===
Collaborative physiomics research is promoted in part by the open availability of bioinformatics software such as simulation programs and modelling environments. There are many institutions and research groups that make their software available to the public. Examples of openly available software include:

- JSim and Systems Biology Workbench – bioinformatics tools offered by The University of Washington.
- BISEN – a simulation environment made available by The Medical College of Wisconsin.
- SimTK – a collection of biological modelling resources made available by The National NIH Center for Biomedical Computing.
- E-Cell System – a simulation and modelling environment for biological systems offered by Keio University in Tokyo, Japan.

Tools such as these are developed using markup languages specific to bioinformatics research. Many of these markup languages are freely available for use in software development, such as CellML, NeuroML, and SBML.

== See also ==
- Genomics
- Omics
- Phenomics
- Proteomics
