= Nutriepigenomics =

Sub-field of nutritional genomics

Nutriepigenomics is a sub-field of nutritional genomics which consists in the study of how food nutrients and bioactive compounds influence human health through epigenetic modifications, such as DNA methylation, histone modifications, and non-coding RNA regulation. While nutrigenomics broadly explores how nutrients and diet impact gene expression, nutriepigenomics specifically examines how these dietary factors induce epigenetic changes without altering the underlying DNA sequence. There is now considerable evidence that nutritional imbalances—especially during gestation, lactation, and early development—can lead to long-term epigenetic alterations, increasing the risk of non-communicable diseases, such as obesity, cardiovascular disease, diabetes, hypertension, and cancer. If metabolic disturbances occur during critical time windows of development, these epigenetic modifications can result in lasting changes to gene expression, tissue function, and disease susceptibility.

Nutriepigenomics is a different field from nutritional epigenetics.

== Overview ==
Epigenetics relates to heritable changes in gene function that occur independently of alterations in primary DNA sequence. Two major epigenetic mechanisms implicated in nutriepigenomics are DNA methylation and histone modification. DNA methylation in gene promoter regions usually results in gene silencing and influences gene expression. While this form of gene silencing is extremely important in development and cellular differentiation, aberrant DNA methylation can be detrimental and has been linked to various disease processes, such as cancer. The methyl groups used in DNA methylation are often derived from dietary sources, such as folate and choline, and explains why diet can have a significant impact on methylation patterns and gene expression. Gene silencing can also be reinforced through the recruitment of histone deacetylases to decrease transcriptional activation. Conversely, histone acetylation induces transcriptional activation to increase gene expression. Dietary components can influence these epigenetic events, thereby altering gene expression and disturbing functions such as appetite control, metabolic balance and fuel utilization.

Various genetic sequences can be targeted for epigenetic modification. A transcriptome-wide analysis in mice found that a protein-restricted (PR) diet during gestation resulted in differential gene expression in approximately 1% of the fetal genes analyzed (235/22,690). Specifically, increased expression was seen in genes involved in the p53 pathway, apoptosis, negative regulators of cell metabolism, and genes related to epigenetic control. Additional studies have investigated the effect of a PR-diet in rats and found changes in promoter methylation of both the glucocorticoid receptor and peroxisome proliferator-activated receptor (PPAR). Altered expression of these receptors can result in elevated blood glucose levels and affect lipid and carbohydrate metabolism. Feeding a PR-diet to pregnant and/or lactating mice also increased expression of glucokinase, acetyl-CoA carboxylase, PPARα, and acyl-CoA oxidase. Changes in expression were reportedly due to epigenetic regulation of either the gene promoter itself, or promoters of transcription factors that regulate gene expression. Additional genes that have been shown, either by in vitro or in vivo studies, to be regulated by epigenetic mechanisms include leptin, SOCS3, glucose transporter (GLUT)-4, POMC, 11-β-hydroxysteroid dehydrogenase type 2 and corticotrophin releasing hormone. Epigenetic modification of these genes may lead to "metabolic programming" of the fetus and result in long-term changes in metabolism and energy homeostasis.

== Nutriepigenomics and development ==
The period of development in which the nutritional imbalance occurs is very important in determining which disease-related genes will be affected. Different organs have critical developmental stages, and the time point at which they are compromised will predispose individuals to specific diseases. Epigenetic modifications that occur during development may not be expressed until later in life depending on the function of the gene. While the majority of studies implicate prenatal and perinatal periods as critical time windows, some research has shown that nutritional intake during adulthood can also affect the epigenome.

=== Prenatal ===
Developmental plasticity is the process in which fetuses adapt to their environment. Environmental cues, including dietary components, present in the in utero environment can induce significant changes in the expression of the genome through epigenetic modifications. Fetal developmental plasticity responses can cause changes in lean body mass, endocrinology, blood flow and vascular loading, and lead to increased risk of various diseases in adulthood. To better understand the long-term consequences of prenatal conditions, the following sections will explore specific outcomes such as low birth weight, obesity, and folate developmental effects. Each of these illustrates how prenatal exposures can shape the long-term health of a person's offspring.

==== Low birth weight ====
Fetal exposure to calcium, folate, magnesium, high or low protein, and zinc have all been associated with birth weight. Numerous studies have investigated the link between birth weight and risk of disease and have found that low birth weight is significantly associated with coronary heart disease, stroke and type-2 diabetes. Most importantly, these associations occurred after adjusting for lifestyle factors, implying a genetic basis for onset of disease. Impaired insulin secretion is associated with low birth weight and can lead to insulin resistance as babies accumulate body fat. Studies using intrauterine growth retarded (IUGR) rats have found that growth inhibition can lead to decreased expression of PDX1 transcription factor, which is essential for differentiation and function of pancreatic beta cells. Decreased histone acetylation at the proximal promoter of PDX1 is responsible for reduced PDX1 expression and subsequently results in a cascade of histone deacetylation and methylation events that can result in type-2 diabetes.

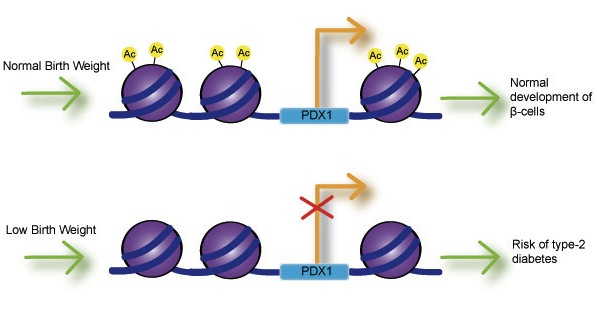
Development of type 2 diabetes following intrauterine growth retardation in rats is associated with progressive epigenetic silencing of PDX1

==== Obesity ====
Obesity during pregnancy and high-fat maternal diets both show strong associations with obesity in offspring. As the number of overweight reproductive-age women increases, the number of overweight children and infants also increases. It has been postulated that maternal obesity causes an accumulation of fat in fetal adipose tissue (adiposity) and predisposes babies for obesity in childhood and adulthood. Animal studies have shown that maternal overnutrition may impact brain development and cause disruptions to programming of the hypothalamus. Offspring that were exposed to a high-fat or high-caloric maternal diet had increased levels of insulin, glucose and leptin. It is hypothesized that these elevations are due to disturbances in the complex neuronal network that includes the neuropeptide Y (NPY) and proopiomelanocortin (POMC) pathways. This altered neuronal signaling can consequently impact food-intake behavior and lead to diet-induced obesity in adulthood. While epigenetic modifications are most likely involved in the development of obesity, the specific target genes have yet to be identified. Genes involved in adipogenesis, such as fibroblast growth-factor-2, phosphatase and tensin homologue, cyclin-dependent kinase inhibitor 1A and oestrogen receptor-alpha, possess multiple CpG islands in their promoter sites and may act as epigenetic targets. Furthermore, it has been shown that prenatal exposure to a hypomethylating agent, such as bisphenol A (BPA), is associated with increased body weight and suggests modified DNA methylation as a mechanism for increasing susceptibility to obesity.

==== Folate ====
It has long been realized that maternal folate intake during pregnancy is linked to fetal development and growth, and can reduce the risk of serious birth defects. Folate is a source of S-adenosyl methionine (SAM), which is used to supply DNA methyltransferases with methyl groups. Therefore, changes in folate supply have a substantial effect on DNA methylation patterns. Low levels of folate are associated with an increased risk of preterm delivery, poor growth of the placenta and uterus, and intrauterine growth retardation. Several complex diseases, including cancer, cardiovascular diseases and autism have also been linked to maternal folate status. Based on animal studies it has been hypothesized that reduced folate intake could increase the risk of neural tube defects by reducing the amount of methylated DNA during cranial neural tube closure. Recently it was discovered that folate protection from congenital heart defects is linked to epigenetics and Wnt signaling. Multiple environmental factors target the Wnt signaling pathway during embryogenesis and can cause misregulation of the pathway. Folic acid metabolism generates SAM, thereby altering the methylation states of histones H3K9, H3K4, and H3K27 and genetically altering Wnt signaling.

Recently a double-blind placebo controlled trial of high dose Folinic Acid (Leucovorin Calcium) demonstrated efficacy at improving verbal communication in children with autism.

=== Perinatal ===
Nutriepigenomics helps refine maternal diets to lower disease risk in offspring by identifying how specific nutrients influence gene expression and metabolic pathways. Through targeted nutritional strategies during pregnancy, healthcare providers can support optimal fetal development, potentially reducing the likelihood of chronic conditions. Another critical developmental time window is the perinatal period, the time immediately before and after birth. It has been shown that maternal diet in late pregnancy and an infant's diet in the beginning weeks can significantly impact gene expression and epigenetics, DNA methylation and histone modification. Therefore, perinatal nutrition is both late-stage in utero nutrition and lactation. The nutritional composition of breast milk, which varies in response to maternal diet, can shape the infant's metabolic and immune systems, potentially causing them to become susceptible to disease. In addition to immune and metabolic effects, perinatal nutrition also plays a key role in other aspects of early development, such as bone health, neurodevelopment, and the risk of autoimmune conditions like type-1 diabetes.

==== Bone health ====
Bone mass and the development of osteoporosis have been studied in relation to perinatal nutrition. An important factor to consider when investigating perinatal nutrition is whether the baby was breast-fed or formula-fed. Breastfeeding plays an important role in bone health and epigenetic modifications during the perinatal period. Proper maternal nutrition during breastfeeding can lead to epigenetic changes that can positively influence the child's skeletal development and long-term health. Studies have shown that breast-fed babies have increased bone mass compared to those were not breast-fed, and that this small increase in bone mass during a period of critical development could potentially program the skeleton to continue along a "healthy" growth trajectory. Vitamin D influences bone health through epigenetic mechanisms such as DNA methylation, histone modifications and chromatin remodeling. It has also been shown that maternal vitamin D insufficiency during late pregnancy is associated with reduced bone size and mineral mass in late childhood. Peak bone mass has shown to be a good predictor of risk of fracture and osteoporosis, with even a small increase in peak bone mass resulting in a much lower risk of bone fracture. Research shows that genetic markers explain only a small proportion of variation in bone mass and risk of fracture. Therefore, healthy bone programming is most likely influenced by various epigenetic mechanisms, such as imprinting of the growth promoting genes IGF-2, or changes to the hypothalamic-pituitary-adrenal axis (HPA).

==== Neurodevelopment ====
Nutrigenomics has an important part in neurodevelopment by showing how nutrients affect gene expression through epigenetic changes, which is the key to brain growth and function. Imbalances in maternal nutrition can also have a significant effect on fetal neurodevelopment. Maternal nutrition during pregnancy influences neurodevelopment through nutriepigenomics, as specific nutrients trigger epigenetic alterations that guide brain formation and future cognitive abilities. Brain development occurs most rapidly during fetal development and infancy, and research has shown that exposure to certain environmental conditions can have long-lasting effects on cognition. Specifically, n-3 fatty acids, iodine, iron and choline have been shown to influence brain development and impact cognitive ability and behavior. The greatest evidence for a link between nutrition and neurodevelopment comes from studies that show low birth weight associated with low IQ and increased risk of schizophrenia. Breastfeeding supports neurodevelopment by providing essential nutrients like omega-3 fatty acids and choline, which are critical for brain growth and function. It also influences epigenetic mechanisms, such as DNA methylation, that shape neural connectivity and cognitive abilities. Several studies suggest that breast-feeding promotes long-term neurodevelopment by providing the nutrients necessary for proper brain development. A study in mice showed that choline-deficient diets during the late gestation period impaired fetal brain development, including decreased cell proliferation and reduced visual-spatial and auditory memory. These cognitive changes appeared to be due to altered histone and DNA methylation patterns in the fetal hippocampus, thus providing a link between maternal nutrition, epigenetics, and early brain development.

==== Type-1 diabetes ====
Type 1 diabetes involves the autoimmune destruction of insulin-producing β-cells in the pancreas. Nutriepigenomics studies how diet influences epigenetic changes, which may affect the development of type 1 diabetes. Breastfeeding may play a role in shaping the infant's epigenome, potentially reducing the risk of autoimmune conditions like type 1 diabetes. It has been postulated that breast-feeding may also protect against type-1 diabetes, with research showing that formula-fed infants are at an increased risk of developing islet autoantibodies. Exclusively breastfeeding for at least the first two weeks can approximately lower the risk of type-1 diabetes 15-30%. Individuals with type-1 diabetes experience a pre-clinical diabetes phase characterized by autoimmunity against pancreatic islets. The introduction of certain foods in the first few months of life, such as berries and cereal, is significantly associated with increased risk of islet autoantibody development compared to babies who are exposed to solid foods later in life. While the pathogenesis behind development of autoantibodies remains largely unknown, it is very probable that an epigenetic link exists between perinatal diet and risk of type-1 diabetes.

=== Adulthood ===
The majority of research in nutriepigenomics has focused on nutritional imbalances during gestation and lactation periods. However, foods that are consumed during adulthood can also impact gene expression and disease pathogenesis. Cancer is the disease most commonly associated with adult nutrition and epigenetic modifications. DNA hypomethylation promotes cancer progression by allowing increased gene transcription, while hypermethylation can silence tumor suppressor genes and further promote uncontrolled cell division and tumor formation. Compounds found in foods, such as genistein and tea polyphenols, are able to regulate DNA methyltransferases and histone acetylation in cultured cancer cells and may provide protection against certain types of cancer. Other dietary compounds, such as diallyl disulfide present in garlic and sulforaphane present in cruciferous vegetables, have been associated with cancer prevention in clinical trials. This may be due to their ability to inhibit histone deacetylase (HDAC) enzymes and prevent silencing of important regulatory genes.

Epigenetic Regulation of Chronic Disease in Adulthood

Epigenetic changes during adulthood have been linked to the onset and progression of chronic diseases such as type 2 diabetes, cardiovascular disease, and cancer. Diets high in saturated fats and refined sugars have been shown to promote aberrant DNA methylation and histone modifications, particularly in genes involved in inflammation, lipid metabolism, and glucose regulation.

For instance, hypermethylation of the adiponectin gene (ADIPOQ) has been observed in adults with obesity and metabolic syndrome, correlating with reduced expression of this anti-inflammatory adipokine. Diet-induced changes in the epigenetic profile of genes like PPARγ, LEP (leptin), and TNF-α have also been implicated in the development of insulin resistance and chronic low-grade inflammation.

Dietary Reversibility of Epigenetic Marks

Unlike genetic mutations, many epigenetic modifications are reversible. Several human and animal studies have demonstrated that dietary interventions—especially those rich in bioactive compounds like polyphenols, isothiocyanates, and omega-3 fatty acids—can modulate epigenetic marks established earlier in life or acquired during adulthood.

For example, epigallocatechin gallate (EGCG) from green tea and sulforaphane from cruciferous vegetables have been shown to inhibit DNA methyltransferases (DNMTs) and histone deacetylases (HDACs), thereby reactivating tumor suppressor genes in certain cancers. Similarly, resveratrol, a polyphenol found in red wine, has been linked to the activation of sirtuins—histone deacetylases involved in longevity and metabolic regulation.

Epigenetics of Aging and Longevity

Aging is accompanied by gradual, global changes in DNA methylation—characterized by hypomethylation of the genome and site-specific hypermethylation of promoter regions in genes associated with aging and cancer. Nutrients that influence one-carbon metabolism, such as folate, B12, and methionine, are central to maintaining methylation balance and preventing epigenetic drift.

One modern study developed an "epigenetic clock" using methylation markers to estimate biological age. Their findings indicated that dietary and lifestyle factors can slow down the rate of epigenetic aging, highlighting the modifiable nature of the epigenome even in late life. Various biological age predictors, including those based on molecular and physiological markers, have been developed to better capture the aging process beyond chronological age.

Impact of Caloric Restriction and Fasting on the Epigenome

Caloric restriction (CR), intermittent fasting, and time-restricted feeding have been shown to modulate epigenetic mechanisms associated with aging and metabolism, including histone acetylation and non-coding RNA expression. These dietary patterns activate AMP-activated protein kinase (AMPK) and sirtuin pathways, promoting genomic stability, autophagy, and reduced inflammation.

Animal studies reveal that CR leads to a reduction in age-related DNA methylation drift and histone modifications linked to inflammation and tumorigenesis. In humans, preliminary findings suggest similar patterns of reduced biological age and improved metabolic profiles, although long-term randomized studies are ongoing.

== Transgenerational effects ==
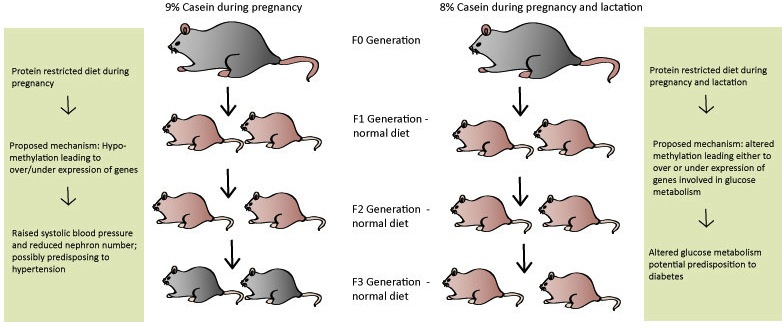
Transgenerational effects of maternal protein restriction

Many believe epigenetic regulation is cleared during the fertilization process, yet more evidence for transgenerational effects (TGEs) are being revealed. These TGEs take place when the epigenetic regulatory patterns are not sufficiently erased during fertilization, possibly due to nutrition levels in previous generations. Later generations may be affected from caloric and protein restriction, high-fat interventions and endocrine disruption in earlier generations. Differences within the nutritional behavior of the maternal rat are believed to cause adverse programming in the F1 generation and may then be passed to subsequent generations. Maternal rats fed a PR-diet during the entire length of pregnancy led to metabolic-related problems in the F1 and F2 generations, even with normal nutrition during the F1 pregnancy. These effects have also been seen in the F3 generation depending on the length of protein restriction. If protein restriction occurred solely during pregnancy, the F1 and F2 offspring had higher systolic blood pressure and lower nephron numbers, possibly predisposing them to hypertension. Altered glucose utilization was detected in the grand-offspring of maternal rats fed a PR-diet during pregnancy and lactation, potentially resulting in diabetes later on in life

Protein-restriction in the F0 generation led to hypomethylation of promoters involved in metabolism in the F1 and F2 generations, even though the F1 pregnant rat was given a normal diet. The exact mechanism of this situation has yet to be elucidated; however, direct transmission is a distinct possibility, meaning the epigenetic marks were preserved during spermatogenesis and oogenesis, when they are normally erased.

== Research of nutriepigenomics ==
Nutriepigenomics is a newly investigated field of nutrition. Nutriepigenomics studies gives data on how different nutrients affect the expression of genes. These studies are conducted to find the effects of different nutritional agents and the results vary. Most models are done in the lab with rats and mice to test the different effects of certain nutritional agents. While other research shows the ability of certain agents to counteract different toxins found in daily diets. Research has been observed with nutritional agents such as B12, folic acid, sulforaphane, curcumin, genistein, and resveratrol. Some studies are done based on diseases such as Type 1 diabetes and situational health like pregnancy, obesity, neurodevelopment, and bone health. The severity of the topic sometimes allows the benefit of testing the nutritional agents on humans instead of animals. Nutritional agents such as B12 and Folic Acid are commonly used in human in models for health of not only the individuals, but for the offspring.

A model for studying IUGR in rodent was developed by Simmons et al. (2010) and is used to investigate type II diabetes. The maternal rats have their uterine arteries ligated, causing altered use of glucose and insulin in the fetus and can therefore serve as a model for diabetes. These growth-retarded rats were found to be highly similar to human fetuses, as they both display symptoms such as lowered glucose and insulin levels. Gestational diabetes may also be studied through chemical induction using streptozotocin treatment of the pregnant rats. Streptozotocin can cause destruction of the beta cells within the pancreas depending on the concentration given.

Sulforaphane was used in a study as a natural combattant to the rare phenotype of triple negative breast cancer. Triple negative breast cancer is a form of cancer that quickly mutates and has limited medication. The treatment of using sulforaphane in low concentration yielded results of tumor suppression and lower cancer cell aggregation.Folic Acid was used in a study to treat hypertension, a predecessor to different cardio-cerebrovascular diseases. The study was done on hypertensive rats that were subjected to different combinations of folic acid treatments. The results showed that folic acid attributed to the increase of nitric oxide synthesis of endothelial cell and decrease of plasma. The effects of folic acid consumption caused the offset of hypertension.Curcumin is a nutritional agent that protects against damage to organs, genotoxicty, and oxidative stress, induced by tartrazine, a synthetic food coloring agent. Tartrazine is a known toxin if exceeded upon the recommended dosage amount. The research was done on rats that were subjected to different dosages of tartrazine and curcumin. In the findings it showed curcumin was able to counteract the adverse effects and protect from further infliction.

Restricting caloric and protein intake are also two most common means of observing impact of nutritional agents. A pregnant rodent may have their caloric intake reduced up to 30-50% of normal intake. Protein restricted rodents are given 8-9% casein, as opposed to control rats that are fed 20% casein. Micronutrients, such as zinc and iron, may also be restricted to investigate the effects on offspring. Additionally, rats fed diets lacking or including methyl donors are often used to study the effects of diet on epigenomics, as variations within the methylation of DNA are common means of silencing or expressing genes. Supplementing maternal mice with folic acid, vitamin B12, choline and betaine leads to increased levels of DNA methylation at CpG sites and causes a coat color change. This is an example of epigenetically modifiable loci called a "metastable epiallele", of which only a few have been identified.

== Future directions ==
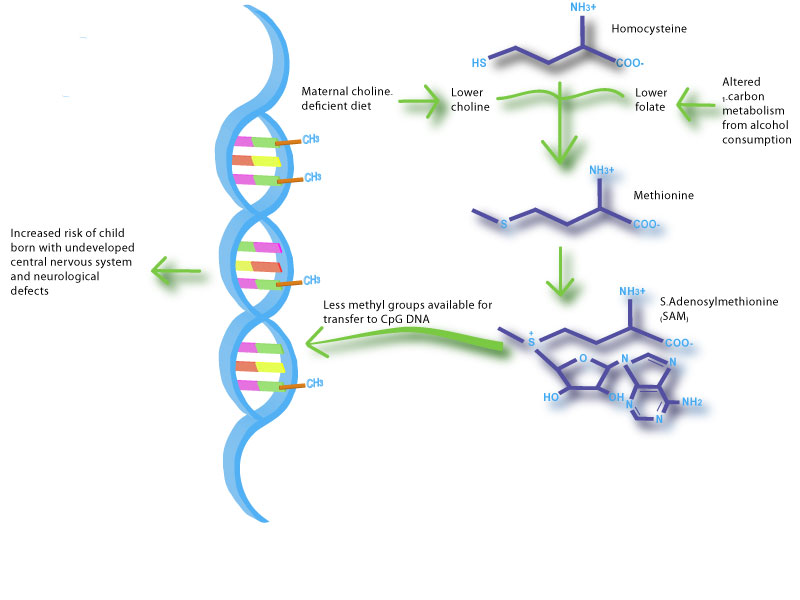
The nutriepigenetic pathway of maternal choline-deficient diets helps to elucidate the development of fetal alcohol syndrome.

The possibilities of utilizing nutriepigenomics for intervention are quite expansive. This can include preventative therapies, such as providing an optimal regime for nutrition during pregnancy and lactation. It is already common place for pregnant mothers to supplement their diets with choline and folate to prevent the development of neurological disabilities in the fetus.

A highly specific diet, termed an "EpiG diet," may be employed for an individual believed to be at higher risk of developing a metabolic disorder. These diets may include supplementation with methyl donors, such as folate. There are also many other natural compounds, such as resveratrol, curcumin and green tea that have been termed "epigenetic modifiers", as they have anti-cancer capabilities in addition to being used as treatments for metabolic diseases. However, the functions of these compounds still require long-term studies to evaluate their effect over time.

There also exists potential for therapeutic treatments that may correct metabolic disorders, such as type II diabetes. Components of garlic and cruciferous vegetables are known to possess HDAC inhibitors that modify the acetylation of histone proteins and may contain a protection against cancer. These same compounds have also been implicated in irritable bowel syndrome (IBS) and colon cancer, as they may modify the histones normally implicated in these diseases.

Elucidation of disease pathways is another future direction for nutriepigenomic studies. For example, choline-deficient diets and alcohol metabolism during pregnancy may have very similar metabolic pathways. Therefore, animal studies using choline-restricted diets may assist in investigations of fetal alcohol spectrum disorders.

When compared to studies of maternal transmission, investigations into the role of paternal diets are lacking. A review demonstrated the nutrition of both parents do in fact play a role in determining the health of their offspring. A germ-line study reported paternal rats fed a high-fat diet led to insulin dysfunction in the F1 offspring. While this likely occurs via epigenetic modifications similar to those postulated in the maternal diets, the exact mechanism remains to be defined. Assessing the role of epigenetic mechanisms may be easier using paternal inheritance, as sperm transmits epigenetic and genetic information, whereas the female cells also transmit mitochondrial DNA.

== See also ==
- Epigenetics
- Epigenome
- Epigenomics
- Genome
- Molecular epidemiology
- Molecular pathological epidemiology
- Nutritional epidemiology
