= Alejandro Cifuentes =

Spanish food chemist

- Born: 6 June 1965 (age 61)
- Citizenship: Spanish
- Education: University of Valladolid (PhD)
- Known for: Introducing the concept of Foodomics
- Scientific career
- Fields: Analytical chemistry, Food science, Metabolomics, Foodomics
- Workplaces: Spanish National Research Council (CSIC)

Alejandro Cifuentes (born 6 June 1965) is a Spanish analytical chemist and food scientist. He is a research professor at the Spanish National Research Council (CSIC). He is known for introducing the concept of Foodomics. He is an editor of TrAC – Trends in Analytical Chemistry.

== Education and career ==
Cifuentes received a Ph.D. in Chemistry in 1992 from the University of Valladolid. He held postdoctoral research at the University of Amsterdam between 1993 and 1995 through a European Union fellowship.

Cifuentes has spent his academic career at the Spanish National Research Council (CSIC). He has headed the Laboratory of Foodomics since 1999 and directed the Metabolomics Platform at the Institute of Food Science Research (CIAL), a joint CSIC–Autonomous University of Madrid facility, since 2012. He was deputy director of the Institute of Industrial Fermentations before serving as CIAL's founding director from 2007 to 2010. He became a full research professor in 2007.

He serves as Editor of TrAC – Trends in Analytical Chemistry, and Specialty Chief Editor of Frontiers in Nutrition. He has also served as editor of Elsevier's reference work.

== Research ==
Cifuentes' research focuses on analytical chemistry, separation science, food science and foodomics . His laboratory develops and applies high-resolution analytical platforms including liquid chromatography–mass spectrometry (LC–MS), gas chromatography–mass spectrometry (GC–MS), capillary electrophoresis–mass spectrometry (CE–MS), multidimensional chromatography, and molecular biology techniques for the characterization of food composition.

He also introduced the concept of Foodomics.

His group has investigated molecular signatures related to cancer, Alzheimer's disease, obesity, inflammation, and other chronic disorders, using metabolomic, lipidomic, transcriptomic and proteomic approaches to understand the mechanisms through which dietary compounds influence disease prevention and progression.

== Selected publications ==
- Cifuentes, Alejandro (2013-02-05). Foodomics: Advanced Mass Spectrometry in Modern Food Science and Nutrition. John Wiley & Sons. ISBN 978-1-118-53735-0.
- Simó, Carolina; Cifuentes, Alejandro; García-Cañas, Virginia (2014). Fundamentals of advanced omics technologies: from genes to metabolites. Comprehensive analytical chemistry. Amsterdam: Elsevier. ISBN 978-0-444-62651-6.
- García-Cañas, Virginia; Cifuentes, Alejandro; Simó, Carolina, eds. (2014-05-08). Applications of Advanced Omics Technologies From Genes to Metabolites. ISBN 978-0-444-62650-9.
- Ibanez, Elena; Cifuentes, Alejandro, eds. (2017-07-17). Green Extraction Techniques: Principles, Advances and Applications. ISBN 978-0-12-811082-9.
- Cifuentes, Alejandro (2020-11-08). Comprehensive Foodomics. ISBN 978-0-12-816395-5.
- Ibáñez, Elena; Zhang, Zhaowei; Cifuentes, Alejandro (2025). "The role of Food Science and Foodomics in the implementation of One-Health". Frontiers in Nutrition. 12. doi:10.3389/fnut.2025.1662767. ISSN 2296-861X. PMC 12483879. PMID 41041135.
- Valdés, Alberto; Sánchez-Martínez, José David; Gallego, Rocío; Ibáñez, Elena; Herrero, Miguel; Cifuentes, Alejandro (2024-01-10). "In vivo neuroprotective capacity of a Dunaliella salina extract - comprehensive transcriptomics and metabolomics study". npj Science of Food. 8 (1). doi:10.1038/s41538-023-00246-7. hdl:10261/359054. ISSN 2396-8370.
- Alvarez-Rivera, Gerardo; Ballesteros-Vivas, Diego; Parada-Alfonso, Fabian; Ibañez, Elena; Cifuentes, Alejandro (2019). "Recent applications of high resolution mass spectrometry for the characterization of plant natural products". TrAC Trends in Analytical Chemistry. 112: 87–101. doi:10.1016/j.trac.2019.01.002.
