= Nutriomics =

Nutriomics is the science that studies the food and nutrition domains comprehensively to improve consumer's well-being and health. More specifically Nutriomics approaches are used to evaluate the effects of different diets to promote health and modulate the risk of disease development.

== See also ==
- Nutrigenomics
- Functional genomics
