= Nutritional epigenetics =

Study of how diet changes gene expression

Nutritional epigenetics is a science that studies the effects of nutrition on gene expression and chromatin accessibility. It is a subcategory of nutritional genomics that focuses on the effects of bioactive food components on epigenetic events.

== History ==
Some of the earliest studies done in the field of nutritional epigenetics were performed in rodent models looking into how diet can affect the epigenome and its relation to cancer development. These studies observed that diets deficient in choline, methionine, and folate were sufficient to increase the incidence of liver carcinoma; linking their findings to DNA hypomethylation around known proto-oncogenes.

Later in the early 2000s, a notable study published in Molecular and Cellular Biology titled Transposable Elements: Targets for Early Nutritional Effects on Epigenetic Gene Regulation was one of the first to demonstrate that genetic fate could be altered through diet. In other words, this meant that the expression of certain genes could be changed through dietary intervention. In this study, researchers Randy Jirtle and Robert A. Waterland used a line of viable yellow agouti mice known to carry the mutant A^{vy} allele, a gene variant resulting in yellow coat colour, adiposity, glucose intolerance, and tumour susceptibility. It was previously known that feeding pregnant dams methyl-supplemented diets was sufficient to produce a higher proportion of heterozygous, pseudo-agouti (brown) offspring compared to mice without methyl supplementation. Using genomic sequencing and methylation assays, Jirtle and Waterland revealed increased methylation around the A^{vy} locus, which mechanistically silenced it. Overall, this study demonstrated that epigenetic changes due to prenatal nutritional intervention can influence disease development later in life.

However, observations of phenotypic changes in children of mothers who experienced malnutrition during pregnancy have been observed as early as the late 19th century during the Great Irish Famine of 1845-1952, where children born during the famine had higher rates of schizophrenia.

The most widely studied example of the effect of famine on a population is the Dutch famine of 1944-1945. Pregnant mothers exposed to famine during early gestation gave birth to children who had higher rates of a number of health issues including obesity, cardiovascular disease, schizophrenia, anti-social personality disorder, and addiction. Studies of the epigenetic profile of these children have found altered levels of DNA methylation on several genes implicated in growth and metabolic disease.

More recently, research has linked the current epidemic of type 2 diabetes to the Great Chinese Famine of 1959-1961. Prenatal exposure to famine altered DNA methylation levels at the IGF2 gene and increased hyperglycemia and type 2 diabetes risk in multiple generations.

== Research ==
Research in nutritional epigenetics focuses on a number of epigenetic mechanisms, including DNA and histone markers, and multiple food groups including methyl donors and vitamins. Nutrition may affect epigenetic modifications either during critical windows of development or due to changes in diet during adulthood.

=== DNA and histone methylation ===
A key area of focus in nutritional epigenetics is on the interplay between dietary methyl donors and DNA methylation. The addition of DNA methyl groups to DNA and histones can alter gene expression by silencing gene promotors or inhibiting transcription factor binding. As a result, DNA methylation plays an important role in genomic imprinting, X-chromosome inactivation, and tissue-specific gene expression. Nutrition affects DNA methylation primarily through one-carbon metabolism, which is a series of reactions catalyzed by enzymes which use dietary micronutrients as cofactors. One-carbon metabolism produces S-adenosylmethionine (SAM), a universal methyl donor. DNA methyltransferase enzymes (DNMTs) can take methyl groups from SAM and attach them to the cytosine bases of DNA, thus methylating it. Nutrients that feed into one-carbon metabolism include vitamins B2, B6, and B12, choline, methionine, and folate.

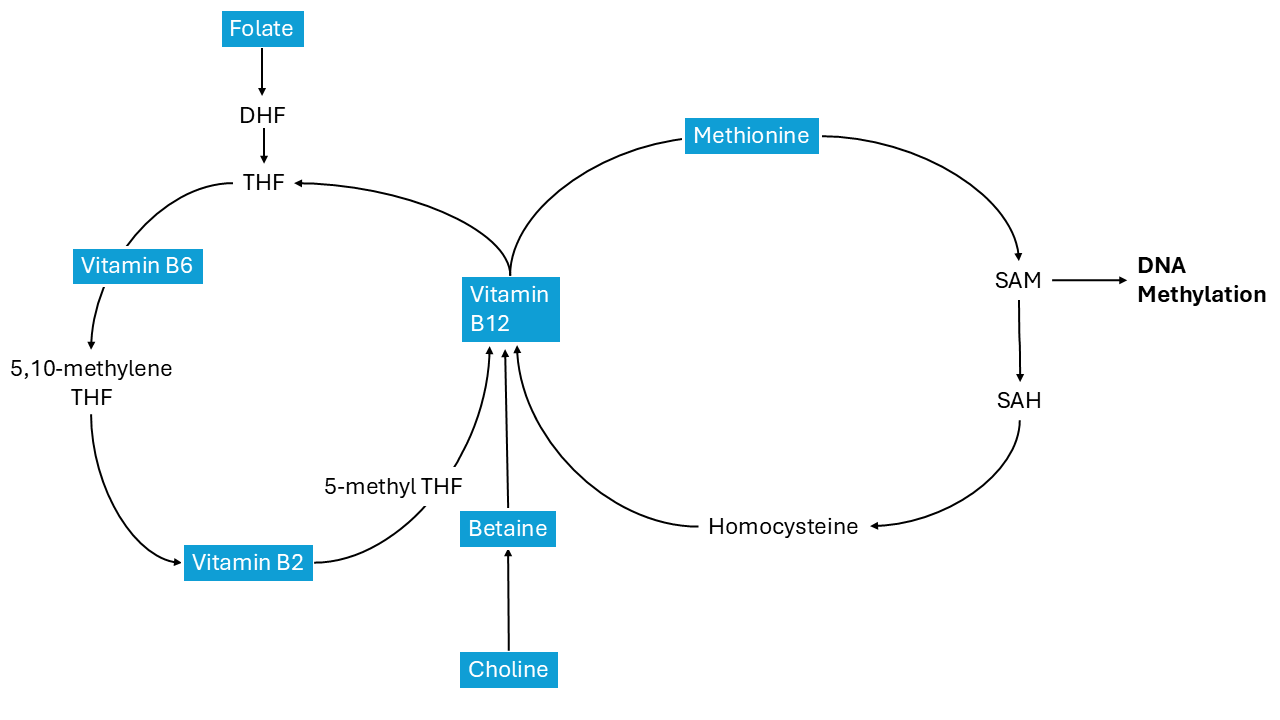
A schematic of one carbon metabolism and its affect on DNA methylation.

Folate is considered the most essential nutrient for DNA methylation during early fetal development. Low dietary folate during pregnancy has been found in both human and animal studies to alter methylation in genes affecting growth and development, which may affect health and cancer susceptibility later in life. Folate insufficiency reduces levels of SAM and therefore methylation in genes essential for cranial neural tube closure and placental development. Because of this, it has been hypothesized that folate insufficiency in mothers increases the risk of neural tube defects in their offspring. To help prevent neural tube defects, several countries including the United States, Chile, Australia, and Canada have fortified folate in staple foods such as wheat flour and cornmeal.

Other dietary compounds, such as epigallocatechin gallate found in green tea and genistein from soybeans can inhibit DNA methyltransferases, demethylating DNA and activating previously silenced genes. These compounds are being investigated as potential therapeutics to decrease hypermethylation in cancer cells.

=== Histone acetylation ===
Acetylation of histones activates gene expression by making DNA more accessible to transcription factors. The enzyme histone acetylase transfers acetyl groups from the metabolic enzyme acetyl-CoA to the lysine tails of histones, changing the conformation of the nucleosome. Studies in animal models have found that both in utero and adult high fat diets can alter acetylation. Mice fed high fat diets had lower levels of acetyl-CoA, which led to lower histone acetylation. In addition, acetylation levels are affected by short chain fatty acids produced through breakdown of dietary fiber in the gut microbiome. These include butyrate, acetate, and propionate. At high concentrations, short chain fatty acids inhibit the acetylation removal enzyme histone deacetylase (HDAC). This increases histone acetylation levels and gene expression.

=== Vitamins and nutrients ===
Beyond traditional methyl donors such as folate and vitamin B12, a variety of other nutrients have been shown to influence epigenetic processes through diverse biochemical mechanisms. Research into other dietary influences are still young and the majority of mechanisms are still not yet understood. Areas of interest include polyunsaturated fatty acids, vitamin D, flavonoids, and more.

==== Vitamin A ====
Vitamin A has been shown to influence epigenetic mechanisms through its metabolite, retinoic acid (RA). RA can bind with two families of receptors involved in DNA methylation and histone acetylation: retinoic acid receptors (RARs) and retinoid X receptors (RXRs). The RAR/RXR complex can bind to specific DNA regions, to begin expression of RA primary response genes. Additionally, it can recruit coactivators such as NCOA3, CBP histone acetyltransferases, and PHF8 to alter chromatin structure and gene expression. In rat models, vitamin A deficiency during gestation has been associated with abnormal DNA methylation of the GATA4 promoter region in offspring, leading to developmental heart defects. While the epigenetic effect of vitamin A deficiency in humans has yet to be confirmed, there is a well-known link between vitamin A, GATA4 expression, and heart development.

==== Vitamin C ====
Vitamin C's influence on the epigenome largely has to do with its function as a co-factor for α-ketoglutarate-dependent dioxygenases, a group of enzymes, some of which play a role in epigenetic reprogramming. These include the Jumonji-C domain-containing histone demethylases (JHDMs) and the ten-eleven translocation (TET) DNA hydroxylase family. TET enzymes play a role in DNA methylation by acting as a catalyst for the oxidization of 5-methylcytosine (5mC) into 5-hydroxymethylcytosine (5hmC). This can lead to two effects: passive DNA demethylation and distinct 5hmC-related epigenetic changes. The precise epigenetic function of 5hmC still remains an active area of research.

Vitamin C has been shown to enhance the activity of both JHDMs and TET enzymes, promoting histone and DNA demethylation. It has also been implicated in somatic cell reprogramming and induced pluripotent stem cell formation. The role of vitamin C in histone demethylation still remains inconclusive however, with conflicting studies suggesting that it impairs histone demethylation. Reductions in 5hmC levels are observed in several human cancers, suggesting reduced TET activity, potentially linked to vitamin C deficiency. Although vitamin C has demonstrated a role in nutritional epigenetics, further research is needed to determine whether vitamin C supplementation can directly alter the epigenome.

==== Vitamin D ====
Vitamin D in its active form, calcitriol, can influence gene expression through epigenetic mechanisms mediated by its nuclear receptor, the vitamin D receptor (VDR). When activated, VDR forms a heterodimer with the retinoid x receptor (RXR) and binds to vitamin D response elements (VDREs) in DNA. This complex is able to recruit various nuclear proteins, such as co-activators, co-repressors, and histone-modifying enzymes, which alter chromatin accessibility and regulate transcription. The main epigenetic modification vitamin D is associated with is histone acetylation. In some studies, VDR has been found to work with pioneer transcription factors to help expose target regions for binding. Additionally, vitamin D may regulate the binding of CTCF, a chromatin-organizing protein involved in the formation of chromatin loops, though current evidence does not conclusively show that this leads to gene repression. Some studies have shown that vitamin D deficiency can lead to alterations in DNA methylation of specific loci and changes in telomerase activity associated with aging.

=== Transgenerational inheritance ===
Epigenetic changes can be both transient and long-lasting, and in some cases, they may be passed across generations. In transgenerational epigenetic inheritance, epigenetic changes are passed down through generations which have not been directly exposed to the environmental stressor that originally caused the epigenetic change. This separates transgenerational inheritance from intergenerational inheritance. In intergenerational epigenetic inheritance, epigenetic effects are seen in parents and offspring who were directly exposed to an environmental stressor simultaneously while the offspring were present in the parent as germ cells or during pregnancy. Most research examining the nutritional effect on transgenerational epigenetic inheritance has been conducted in animal models. The only human models existing looking into this come from historic events such as the Dutch famine.

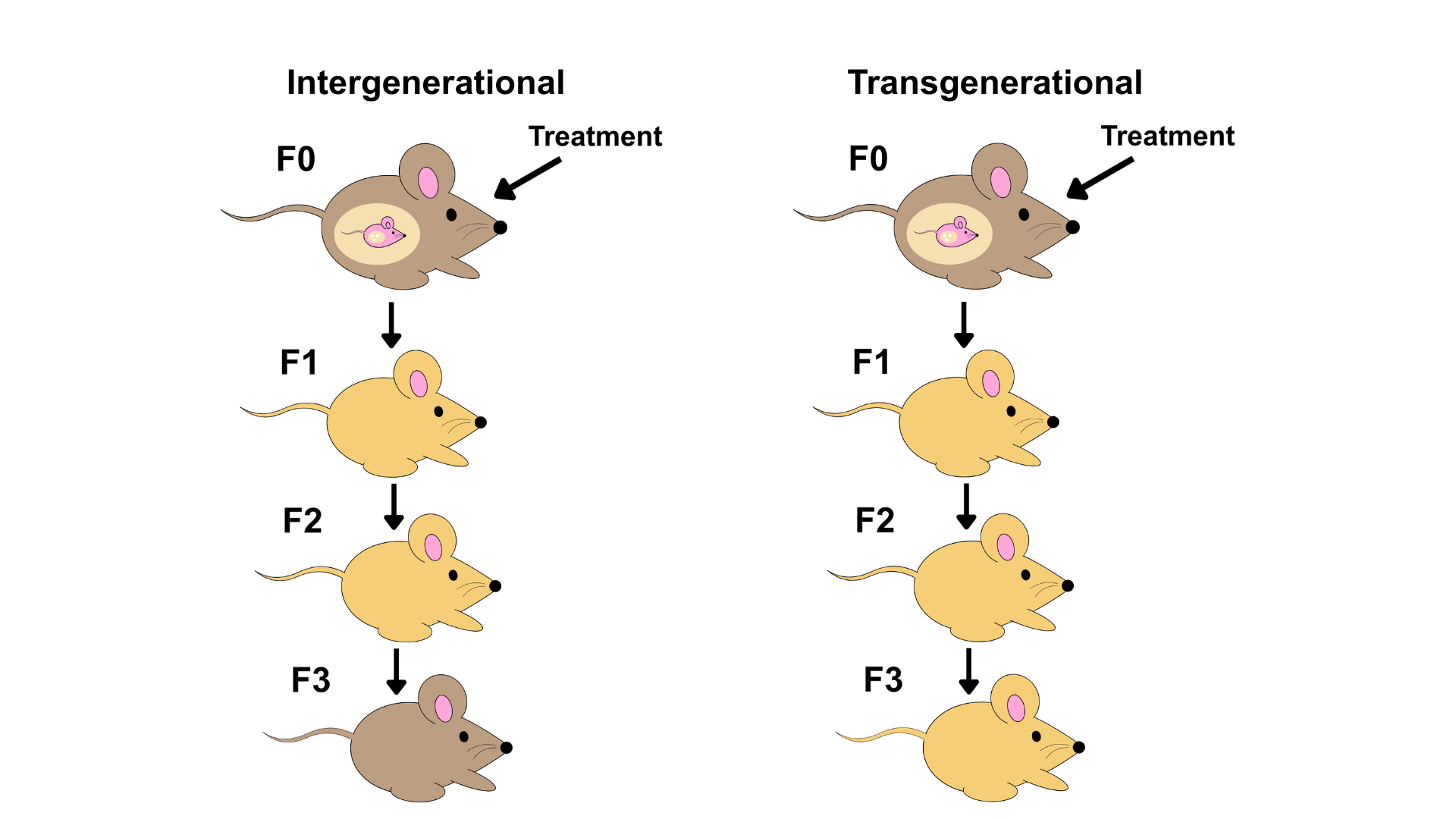
Intergenerational vs Transgenerational epigenetic inheritance through the mother

It is well known that in utero, dietary influences can affect the epigenome of the offspring. Some research suggests that these effects may be transgenerational. In mice models, when lines of agouti mice are supplemented with methyl-donors, their heterozygous (A^{vy}/a) offspring tend to have higher levels of methylation around the A^{vy} allele and are born with a pseudo-agouti coat. These effects persist into future generations, although there is little information regarding how many generations the effects can remain for. Several studies have suggested that these epigenetic changes are passed down through the paternal lineage, with sperm being more susceptible to changes in the diet.

There is currently no set model for how transgenerational epigenetic inheritance occurs, however some studies have suggested possible mechanisms. There are two major epigenetic reprogramming events in an organisms lifetime: one post-fertilization and the second during primordial germ cell migration. These events involve extensive erasure of epigenetic marks in order to restore cellular totipotency, however evidence suggests that some marks are able to escape epigenetic reprogramming. After erasure, these marks are restored through epigenetic reconstruction.

One proposed model of reconstruction involves RNA-mediated inheritance via siRNAs and germ granules. Germ granules are a type of biomolecular condensate that can help organize RNA based inheritance pathways from parent to offspring. In particular, tsRNAs (segmented tRNAs) are found in high concentrations in the sperm and have been shown to be affected by diet. For example, in male mice fed high fat diets, multiple RNA modifications are seen in the sperm. Specifically, the tsRNAs 5-methylcytidine and N2-methylguanosine marks have been shown to be significantly upregulated, and offspring are more susceptible to developing metabolic disorders such as obesity, suggesting epigenetic inheritance.

== Related health conditions ==
Research into nutritional epigenetics has investigated potential links between diet, epigenetics, and a number of health conditions.

=== Metabolic disorders ===
Metabolic disorders such as type 2 diabetes, obesity, and glucose intolerance are complex disorders determined by a combination of genetics and epigenetics. Epigenome-wide association studies have found associations between methylation at multiple locations in the genome and type 2 diabetes, insulin resistance, and obesity. Under- or over-nutrition during fetal development and adult life can cause epigenetic changes that increase the risk of metabolic disorders. The mechanisms behind this risk are currently being investigated, primarily through animal models. Studies in rats have found maternal protein deficiency lead to hypermethylation and chromatin compaction of DNA within the liver. Similarly, maternal high-fat diets in mice have also been shown to influence metabolic disease risk in offspring. Current evidence suggests that these outcomes may be mediated by epigenetic changes within the hypothalamus that alter feeding behaviour in the offspring. In addition, paternal low protein diet in mice alters DNA methylation levels in their offspring's liver, affecting cholesterol biosynthesis. This is consistent with human studies, which have found correlation between both paternal and maternal overnutrition or obesity with metabolic disease risk in their children.

=== Mental health conditions ===
Exposure to dietary extremes during fetal development and early life has been found to contribute to the development of a number of mental health conditions and neurodevelopmental disorders. Nutritional deficiencies during fetal development can induce epigenetic changes that alter brain function into adulthood. In particular, methyl-donors like choline and betaine act as neuroprotectants. In rodent studies, a high choline diet during pregnancy was found to improve cognitive function and memory.

==== Schizophrenia ====
Most well documented among neurodevelopmental disorders affected by nutritional epigenetics is schizophrenia. Schizophrenia is a neurodevelopmental disorder which is typically not diagnosed until adulthood. Studies have found that maternal starvation is linked to an increased risk in schizophrenia. This link is well documented through studies of famines. Primarily, research has focused on the Dutch famine of 1944-1945, where the population was subject to strict and recorded rations, allowing researchers to identify a clear correlation between the amount of food during different periods of prenatal development and schizophrenia onset later in life. These findings were replicated in studies of people in Wuhu Province and Liuzhou prefecture, China, following the Great Chinese Famine of 1959-1961. A 2-fold increase in schizophrenia was later found in children who, at the time of the famine, were in the early stages of fetal development.

==== Affective disorders ====
Deficiency in a number of nutrients has been linked to complex affective disorders. In particular, research has suggested a link between nutritional epigenetics and major depressive disorder. Evidence has suggested that epigenetics can alter depression risk long term, and a number of changes in DNA and histone methylation have been found in individuals with depression. Supplementation of vitamins B-6 and B-12 in adults has been found to decrease depression risk, supporting an active role of nutritional epigenetics beyond fetal development. In addition, changes within the gut microbiome in response to dietary changes such as high fat, sugar, protein, or fiber intake have been linked to depression. Alterations within the gut microbiome can change B5 and B12 vitamin synthesis, leading to downstream changes in DNA methylation.

Other affective disorders may be influenced by nutritional epigenetics. Notably, rat studies have found that maternal low-protein diet can increase anxious behaviors and disturb sleeping patterns of offspring.

=== Cancer ===
Cancer is caused by abnormal cell proliferation and driven by the accumulation of genetic mutations. Because epigenetic mechanisms play central roles in regulating cell proliferation and survival, they have also become a major focus in cancer research. Cancer has been associated with epigenetic alterations such as global DNA hypomethylation, promoter-specific hypermethylation, and reduced expression of microRNAs. These changes can disrupt normal gene regulation, leading to increased activity of transcription factors associated with oncogenes and impaired expression of tumour suppressor genes.

The presence of bioactive compounds in the diet has been widely investigated for their potential role in cancer treatment and prevention. Bioactive compounds are nutritional components capable of interacting with cellular pathways to produce physiological effects, with several linked to cancer development. Some well-known examples include catechins, resveratrol, and isoflavones. These can work through a variety of pathways, affecting epigenetic regulators such as DNMTs and HDACs. Numerous experimental studies in animal models have reported anti-cancer properties; however, findings from human cohort studies remain inconsistent. Variables such as metabolic processing, bioavailability, and effective dosing contribute to this discrepancy. Ongoing research continues to explore strategies for enhancing the efficacy of these compounds and assessing their potential in the development of targeted cancer therapeutics.

=== ADHD and autism ===
Differences in maternal nutrition have been associated with epigenetic variations in fetal development, suggesting potential links to attention deficit hyperactivity disorder (ADHD) and autism spectrum disorder. Several nutritional factors in the maternal diet have been associated with altered risk. Diets low in vitamin D, folate, and omega−3 fatty acids have been linked to a higher incidence of autism spectrum disorder in observational cohort studies, however the mechanisms remain unclear. Research into the genetic basis of ADHD and autism are still under investigation, making it difficult to support findings on the epigenetic effects of bioactives in this region.

== Environmental factors ==
The environment can shape nutritional epigenetics by influencing factors such as availability, safety, and composition of the foods people consume, thereby playing a role in modifying epigenetic marks.

=== Pollutants ===
Food quality issues vary from one geographic region to the next depending on food safety practices, manufacturing and agricultural regulations regarding heavy metal, pesticide residues, and other hazardous exposures of concern. To reduce exposures to chemical hazards such as pesticide and heavy metal residues, the World Trade Organization (WTO) sponsored agreements between countries to establish codes of best practices, issued by the Codex Alimentarius Commission, that attempt to guarantee the trade of safe food. Despite the best practices in use, heavy metal and pesticide residues can still enter the food supply chain.Prenatal and postnatal dietary exposures to inorganic mercury and lead residues have been shown to consistently impact important gene behaviors in children with autism and attention deficit/hyperactivity disorder. The effect of toxins on the epigenome is still under investigation. Research using in vitro cell lines has found that pesticides can alter DNA methylation levels, though the consequences on health need further investigation.

=== Food insecurity ===
Food insecurity, defined as limited or uncertain access to sufficient and nutritious food, can influence nutritional epigenomics by altering dietary nutrient availability and, in turn, the epigenetic regulation of gene expression. It is often linked to lower quality diets due to their cost, accessibility, and energy-density. These inexpensive foods are often high in carbohydrates, fats, and salt but lack essential micronutrients, leading to nutritional deficiencies and increased disease likelihood. It is theorized that this dietary imbalance can cause epigenetic changes alongside physiological alterations. Historical evidence from severe cases of food insecurity, such as famine, supports this connection; however, the potential epigenetic effects of moderate food insecurity, such as those arising from financial constraints, remain largely unexplored.
