= Global Health Share Initiative =

Global HealthShare initiative (GHS) is a program launched in June 2010 by the University of California, Davis Center of Excellence for Nutritional Genomics. The program plans to share resources to improve the health in developing countries. Alliances with other research institutions, humanitarian organizations and private companies around the world have been made to meet this goal.

The organization uses a multidisciplinary approach against chronic and infectious disease, breaking down their efforts into two main research "cores": the Nutrition Core and Mucosal Immunity Core. The former focuses on fighting malnutrition and the latter on developing new ways to deliver vaccines more effectively to developing countries. The program differentiates itself from others like it by focusing on the delivery of the beneficial product to the end-user rather than the academic research process.

== See also ==
- Nutrigenomics

== Sources ==
- Global HealthShare Initiative Website
