= DNA oxidative demethylase =

Identifiers
- EC no.: 1.14.11.33

Databases
- IntEnz: IntEnz view
- BRENDA: BRENDA entry
- ExPASy: NiceZyme view
- KEGG: KEGG entry
- MetaCyc: metabolic pathway
- PRIAM: profile
- PDB structures: RCSB PDB PDBe PDBsum
Search
- PMC: articles
- PubMed: articles
- NCBI: proteins

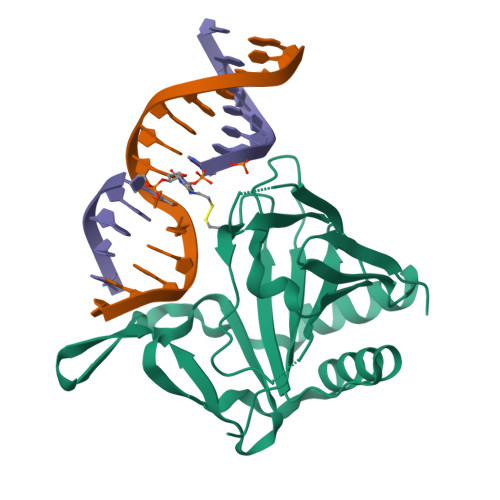
AlkB family protein removes methyl groups from DNA through oxidative reaction

DNA oxidative demethylase (EC 1.14.11.33, alkylated DNA repair protein, alpha-ketoglutarate-dependent dioxygenase ABH1, alkB (gene)) is an enzyme with systematic name methyl DNA-base, 2-oxoglutarate:oxygen oxidoreductase (formaldehyde-forming). The enzymes remove methyl groups from DNA through the following oxidative reaction:

DNA-base-CH_{3} + 2-oxoglutarate + O_{2} $\rightleftharpoons$ DNA-base + formaldehyde + succinate + CO_{2}

During this process, the enzyme oxidizes the methylated base and releases the methyl group as formaldehyde, restoring the base to its unmethylated form. DNA methylation [5-methylcytosine(5mc)] and DNA demethylation serve critical roles in epigenetic regulation. Notable examples include the AlkB family, first identified in Escherichia coli, involved predominantly in DNA repair, and the TET enzyme family, which oxidatively demethylates 5-methylcytosine, playing central roles in epigenetic regulation. Dysfunction or mutation of these enzymes is associated with genomic instability, improper gene regulation and damage response, and implicated in diseases such as cancer.

DNA methylation is crucial in regulating gene expression and cellular function, but dysregulation can lead to cytotoxic or mutagenic consequences creating a need for demethylases.

== Classification ==
DNA oxidative demethylases belong under the broader category of Fe(II)/α-ketoglutarate-dependent dioxygenase enzyme family. This is a class of enzymes catalyze oxidative reactions that remove methyl groups from DNA bases, thereby reversing DNA methylation modifications. These enzymes are share characteristics such as the iron-binding motif His1-X-Asp/Glu-Xn-His2, which is the catalytic site for oxygen activation. Additionally, the active site of all Fe(II)/α-ketoglutarate-dependent dioxygenase enzymes contains a double-stranded β-helix (DSBH) fold.

Prominent enzyme families within DNA oxidative demethylases include AlkB proteins and TET enzymes. The AlkB family are oxidative dealkylation DNA repair enzymes that protects the bacterial genome against alkylation damage. AlkB was discovered in 1977 by Samson and Cairns in E. coli cells. The TET (ten-eleven translocation) proteins play an important role in epigenetic regulation of the cell by catalyzing iterative oxidative demethylation steps of the epigenetic mark 5-methylcytosine (5mC).

== Structure and mechanism ==
DNA oxidative demethylases operate through several mechanisms that oxidize the methyl group to achieve DNA demethylation.

=== Co-factors ===
Fe(II)/alpha-ketoglutarate (αKG)- dependent dioxygenases, originally discovered in E. coli, repairs DNA by oxidatively removing methyl groups from certain DNA bases that have been damaged. The iron-binding group is the central catalytic site for oxygen activation with molecular oxygen (O_{2}), and 2-oxoglutarate (α-ketoglutarate) as co-substrates. Ascorbate (vitamin C) has been found to enhances demethylation.

=== Substrates ===
The target of this reaction is the methylated bases on DNA. This includes epigenic markers like 5-methylcytosine (5mC) in genomic DNA, as well as DNA lesions such as N¹-methyladenine and N³-methylcytosine that arise from alkylation damage. 5mC holds an important role in regulating transcription The methyl group is both chemically and genetically stable as it is connected to the cystine in a carbon-carbon bond. This creates a barrier for the removal of the methyl group and a need for enzymes like DNA oxidative demethylase.

Different subtypes of DNA oxidative methylases work with different substrates. For example, the AlkB family repairs DNA that have been damaged by demethylating methyladenine or methylcytosine lesions. Additionally, TET (ten-eleven-translocation) family proteins oxidize 5mC methylation mark.

=== Catalytic steps ===
1. Substrate recognition: DNA oxidative demethylases recognize the methylated base on DNA as the binding site.
2. Base-flipping: AlkB flip their target base out of the double-stranded DNA helix into their catalytic pocket. This is done by a base-flipping mechanism where AlkB uses a short "pinch" to squeeze together the two flanking bases such that they stack onto one another.
3. Oxidation of methyl group: Once bound, Fe(II) and αKG are used oxidize the methyl base. Two electrons from both Fe(II) and αKG are used to activate a dioxygen molecule. In TET proteins, use iterative steps of oxidative to mediate the reversal of 5mC methylation.
4. Release of methyl group: Methyl groups are released as formaldehyde leaving behind the demethylated base. Fe(IV)-oxo intermediate created during the reaction is reduced back into Fe(II) to complete the catalytic cycle.
5. Additional processing (as needed): For 5-methylcytosine iterative oxidations are needed instead of one-step removal. This is facilitated by TET that converts 5mC -> 5hmC -> 5fC -> 5caC.

== Function ==
DNA methylation can modify but also damage DNA when dysregulated leading to various human diseases including cancer. DNA oxidative demethylation serves a major role in DNA repair and epigenetic regulation by protecting from mutations and genomic instability.

DNA oxidative demethylation also has significant biological implications. DNA demethylation serves a significant role in mammalian development. Demethylation is critical for fertilization of eggs by sperm in preimplantation development and continues to serve a role in primordial germ cell reprogramming and stem cell and somatic cell reprogramming. For example, after fertilization embryos undergo extensive global DNA demethylation in paternal and maternal genomes. In the paternal genome, demethylation involves active oxidation by TET3 enzyme, converting 5mC into intermediate forms (5hmC, 5fC, and 5caC). Whereas in maternal cells, limited active oxidation occurs due to factors that reduce the activity of TET3. Another example is TET1 enzymes which are critical for erasing imprinting marks. In females, TET1 deficiency in primordial germ cells (PGCs) causes meiotic defects due to failed activation of meiotic genes. In males, TET1 deficiency causes abnormal imprinting patterns in sperm.

Research has shown that DNA demethylation is critical to neuronal activity as neurons contain high levels of 5hmc. TET-mediated demethylation supports the adaptability of the brain in response to learning and the environment. For example, TET3 regulates fear extinction, splicing regulation, and dendritic development.

=== Regulation of DNA demethylase activity ===
As DNA methylation is essential to the genome stability and gene expression, DNA demethylation is tightly regulated but is only beginning to be understood. TET activity is regulated by multiple factors, such as intracellular metabolites, nutritional and developmental signals, stress, and chemical exposure. As discussed above, TET enzymes require Fe(II) and α-ketoglutarate (αKG) as cofactors. Since αKG is a metabolic intermediate, demethylation activity is regulated by the cell's metabolic state. Oncometabolite 2-hydroxyglutarate (2HG) metabolites are structurally similar to αKG and inhibit TET activity Additionally, fumarate and succinate, which are other metabolic intermediates, are also similar in structure to αKG. They are competitive inhibitors of Fe(II)/αKG-dependent dioxygenases.

== Clinical relevance ==
TET proteins have been shown to play a role in hematological cancer. TET2 mutations are often early events in cancer evolution and increase a patient's risk of developing blood cancers. For example, TET2 mutations are observed in 20%-58% of patients with Chronic Myelomonocytic Leukemia (CMML), 20%-83% with T-cell lymphomas, and are associated with many more blood cancers. TET2 mutations are not unique to a disease subtype but instead involved in many disease processes in ways still not fully understood.

Studying diseases associated with DNA oxidative demethylation knockouts can give further insight on the function of the enzymes. In knockouts, the enzymes are absent or impaired. Studies using mouse embryonic stem cells (ESCs) have provided insight into the functional roles of DNA oxidative demethylases, particularly the TET family proteins. Loss of TET1 in ESCs skews differentiation toward specific lineages. Similarly, loss of TET2 delays enhancer activation and slows transcriptional changes during differentiation. TET1/2/3 triple knockouts severely impairs the normal differentiation process, leading to widespread dysregulation of gene expression, although some pluripotency markers remain intact.
