= Mitointeractome =

Mitochondrial protein interactome database

Mitointeractome is a mitochondrial protein interactome database.
