= Nutritional genomics =

Study of the effects of nutrition on genes

Nutritional genomics, also known as nutrigenomics, is a science studying the relationship between human genome, human nutrition and health. People in the field work toward developing an understanding of how the whole body responds to a food via systems biology, as well as single gene/single food compound relationships. Nutritional genomics emerged as a new field of research in 2001. Nutriepigenomics and nutritional epigenetics are two sub-fields of nutrigenomics.

== Introduction ==
The term "nutritional genomics" is an umbrella term including several subcategories, such as nutrigenetics, nutrigenomics, and nutritional epigenetics. Each of these subcategories explain some aspect of how genes react to nutrients and express specific phenotypes, like disease risk. There are several applications for nutritional genomics, for example how much nutritional intervention and therapy can successfully be used for disease prevention and treatment.

== Background and Preventive Health ==
Nutritional science originally emerged as a field that studied individuals lacking certain nutrients and the subsequent effects, such as the disease scurvy which results from a lack of vitamin C. As other diseases closely related to diet (but not deficiency), such as obesity, became more prevalent, nutritional science expanded to cover these topics as well. Nutritional research typically focuses on preventative measure, trying to identify what nutrients or foods will raise or lower risks of diseases and damage to the human body.

For example, Prader–Willi syndrome, a disease whose most distinguishing factor is insatiable appetite, has been specifically linked to an epigenetic pattern in which the paternal copy in the chromosomal region is erroneously deleted, and the maternal loci is inactivated by over methylation. Yet, although certain disorders may be linked to certain single-nucleotide polymorphisms (SNPs) or other localized patterns, variation within a population may yield many more polymorphisms.

== Mediterranean diet ==
The Mediterranean diet refers to naturally occurring foods native to Greece, Italy Portugal and Spain before globalization of food products in the 20th century. The diet includes relatively high consumption of fruit, vegetables, olive oil, legumes, whole grains and moderate amounts of red wine. Foods with increased fat and dairy are minimally consumed. Some nutritional genomics studies have pointed towards the Mediterranean diet to be most nutritionally beneficial. It has been positively linked towards decreased mortality by providing protective agents against metabolic diseases, cardiovascular disease and several types of cancer. These benefits have been attributed to the abundance of dietary compounds present in Mediterranean staples. Examples of this include Curcuma longa (turmeric), resveratrol, lycopene, capsaicin, quercetin, and polyphenols in extra virgin olive oil. It has been suggested that each of these allegedly bioactive compounds, along with several others, interacts with the body's cellular and molecular function, gene expression and epigenome to prevent angiogenesis and the development of neurodegenerative disease.

== Applications ==
The applications of nutritional genomics are multiple. With personalized assessment some disorders (diabetes, metabolic syndrome) can be identified. Nutrigenomics can help with personalized health and nutrition intake by assessing individuals and make specific nutritional requirements. The focus is in the prevention and the correction of specific genetic disorders. Examples of genetic related disorders that improve with nutritional correction are obesity, coronary heart disease (CHD), hypertension and diabetes mellitus type 1. Genetic disorders that can often be prevented by proper nutritional intake of parents include spina bifida, alcoholism and phenylketouria.

=== Coronary heart disease ===
Genes tied to nutrition manifest themselves through the body's sensitivity to food. In studies about CHD, there is a relationship between the disease and the presence of two alleles found at E and B apolipoprotein loci. These loci differences result in individualized reactions to the consumption of lipids. Some people experience increased weight gain and greater risk of CHD whereas others with different loci do not. Research has shown a direct correlation between the decrease risk of CHD and the decrease consumption of lipids across all populations.

=== Obesity ===
Obesity is one of the most widely studied topics in nutritional genomics. Due to genetic variations among individuals, each person could respond to diet differently. By exploring the interaction between dietary pattern and genetic factors, the field aims to suggest dietary changes that could prevent or reduce obesity.

There appear to be some SNPs that make it more likely that a person will gain weight from a high fat diet; for people with AA genotype in the FTO gene showed a higher BMI compared those with TT genotype when having high fat or low carbohydrate dietary intake. The APO B SNP rs512535 is another diet-related variation; the A/G heterozygous genotype was found to have association with obesity (in terms of BMI and waist circumference) and for individuals with habitual high fat diet (>35% of energy intake), while individuals with GG homozygous genotype are likely to have a higher BMI compared to AA allele carriers. However, this difference is not found in low fat consuming group (<35% of energy intake).

=== Phenylketonuria ===
Phenylketonuria, otherwise known as PKU, is an uncommon autosomal recessive metabolic disorder that takes effect postpartum but the debilitating symptoms can be reversed with nutritional intervention.

== See also ==
- Diet (nutrition)
- Foodomics
- Genomics
- Global Health Share Initiative
- Nutriepigenomics
- Nutriomics
- Orthomolecular medicine
- Public health genomics
- Roger J. Williams
