= Foodomics =

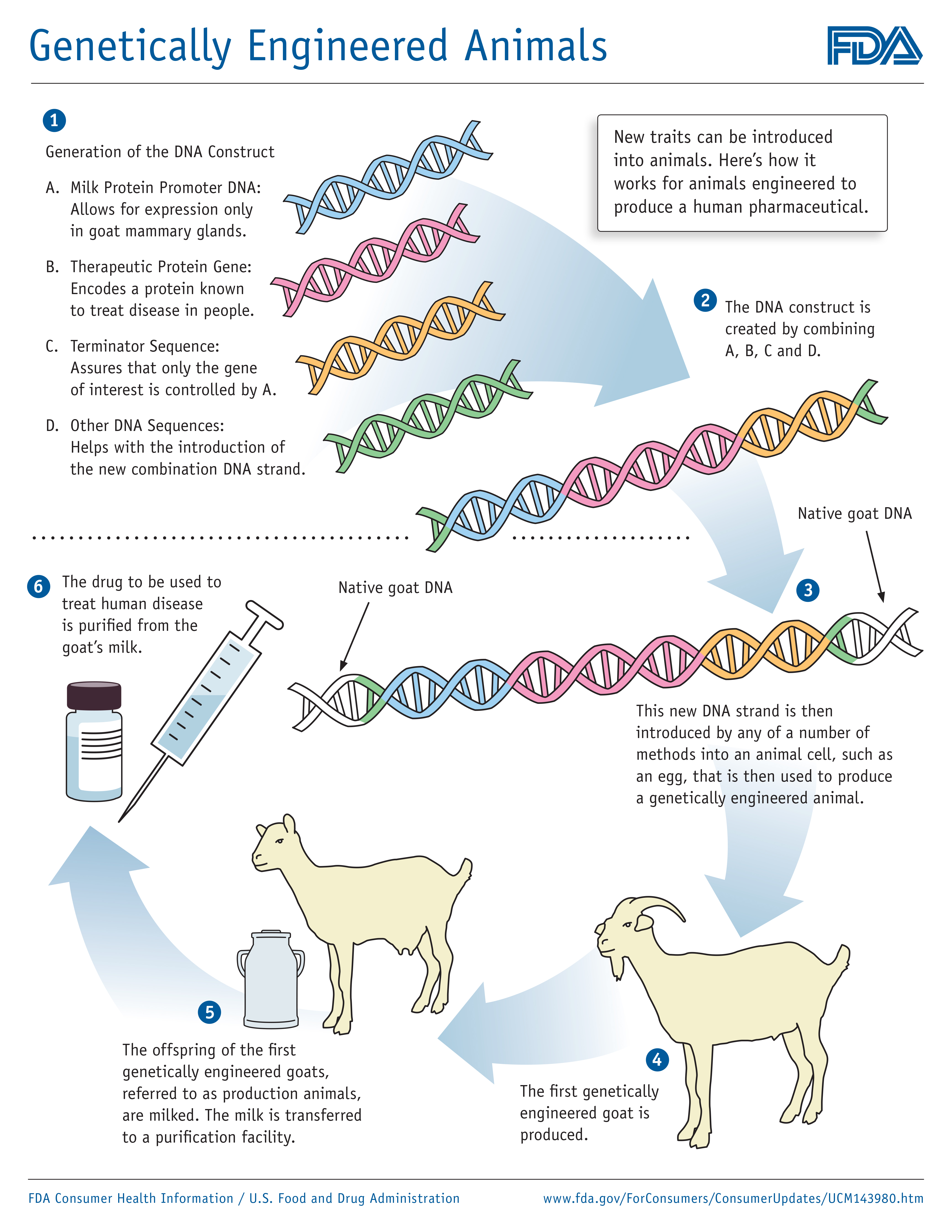
Genetically engineered animals

Foodomics was coined in 2009 as "a discipline that studies the Food and Nutrition domains through the application and integration of advanced -omics technologies to improve consumer's well-being, health, and knowledge". Foodomics is intended to combine food chemistry, biological sciences, and data analysis.

The study of foodomics was introduced in the a similarly-titled international conference in 2009 at Cesena, Italy. Experts in the field of nutrition were invited to explore new approached and possibilities in the area of food science and technology. However, research and development of foodomics are limited due to high throughput analysis required. The American Chemical Society journal called Analytical Chemistry dedicated its cover to foodomics in December 2012.

Foodomics involves four main areas of "-omics":

- Genomics, which involves investigation of genome (genes) and its interactions with each other and the environment.
- Transcriptomics, which explores a set of gene and identifies the difference among various conditions, organisms, and circumstance, by using several techniques including microarray analysis;
- Proteomics, studies the proteins that are a product of the genes. It covers how protein functions in a particular place, structures, interactions with other proteins, etc.;
- Metabolomics, includes chemical diversity in the cells and how it affects cell behavior;

== Advantages of foodomics ==
Foodomics has been proposed to help food science and nutrition gain a better access to the data which used to analyze the effects of food on human health. It is proposed to be a step towards better understanding of development and application of technology and food.

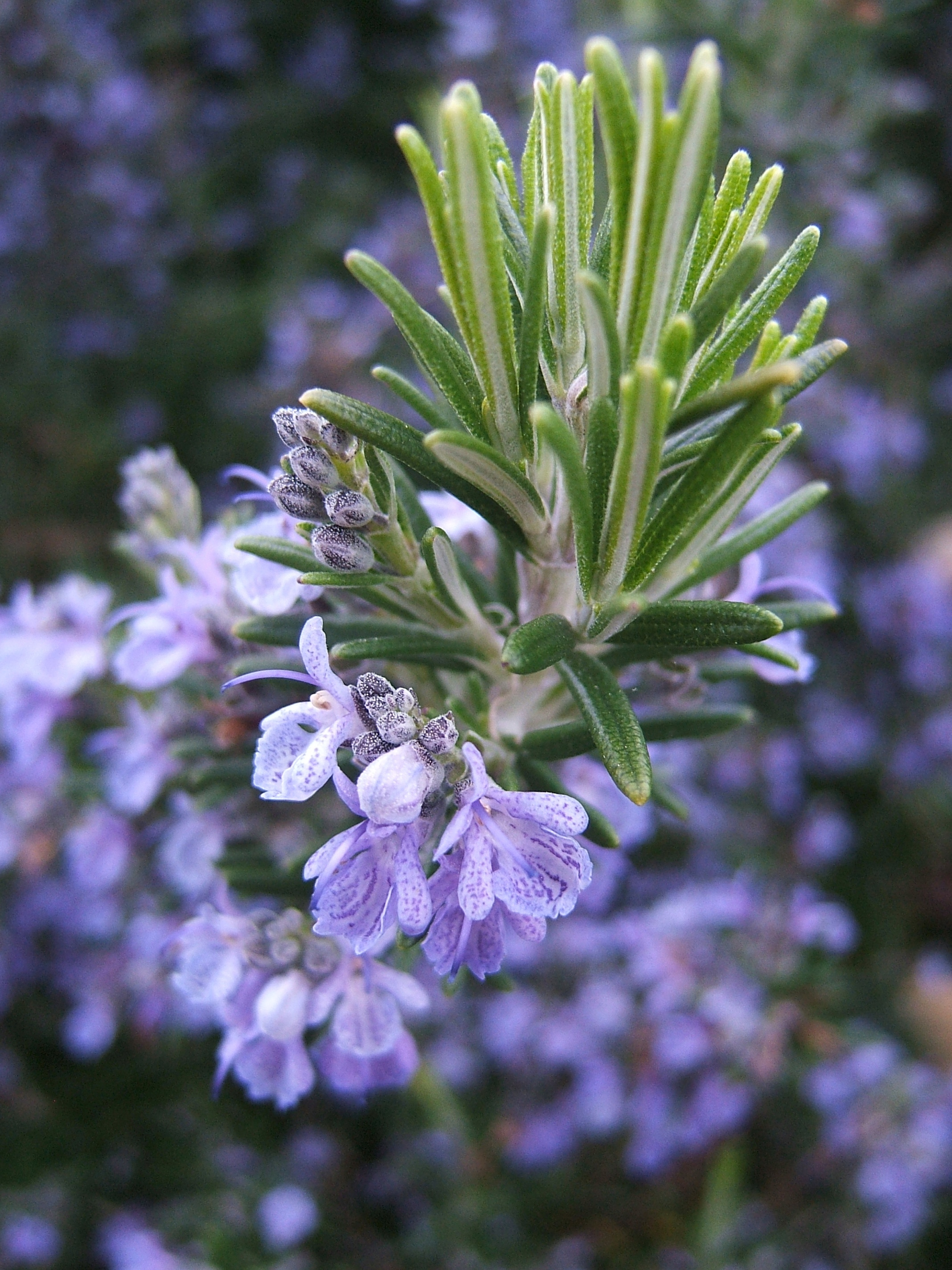
Rosemary

=== Colon cancer ===
Foodomics approach is used to analyze and establish the links between several substances presented in rosemary and the ability to cure colon cancer cells. There are thousands of chemical compounds in rosemary, and some have been suggested to help cure such disease are carnosic acid (CA) and carnosol (CS), which can be extracted from rosemary via supercritical fluid extraction (SFE). They may have the potential to fight against and reduce the proliferation of human HT-29 colon cancer cells.

An experiment done by inserting rosemary extracts to the mice and collecting RNA and metabolites from each controlled and treating individual indicated that there is a correlation between the compounds used and the percentage of recovery from the cancer. This information is however never achievable without the help of foodomics knowledge as it was used to process data, analyze statistic, and identify biomarkers. Foodomics, coupled with transcriptomic data, shows that Carnosic acid leads to the accumulation of an antioxidant, glutathione (GSH). The chemical can be broken down to cysteinylglycine, a naturally occurring dipeptide and an intermediate in the gamma glutamyl cycle. Moreover, the result from an integration of foodomics, transcriptomics and metabolomics reveals that provoking colon cancer cell compounds, such as N‐acetylputrescine, N‐acetylcadaverine, 5'MTA and γ‐aminobutyric acid, can also be lowered by CA treatment.

such research may be useful in reaching another approach for tackling proliferation against cancer cells.

=== Processed meat ===
Aside from measuring the concentration of protein in meat, calculating bioavailability is another way in determining the total amount of component and quality. The calculation is done when food molecules are digested in various steps. Since human digestion is very complicated, a wide range of analytical techniques are used to obtain the data, including foodomics protocol and an in vitro static simulation of digestion.

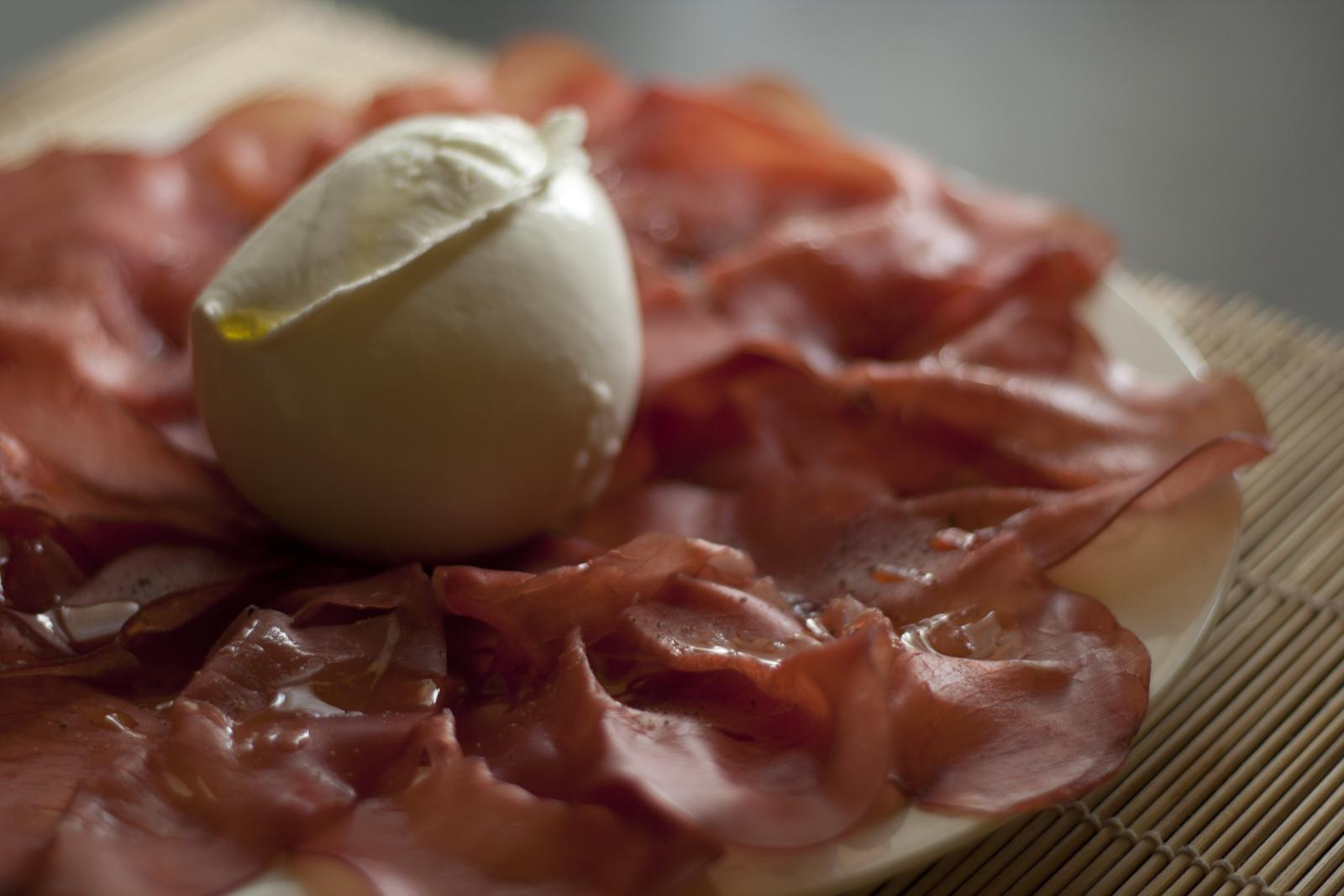
Bresaola or the air-dried and salted beef. It is made from a single muscle of beef.

The procedure is divided into 3 stages as the samples are collected from oral, gastric and duodenal digestion in order to study protein digestibility closely and thoroughly. A meat based food, Bresaola, is evaluated because beef muscles are still intact, which can be used to indicate nutritional value.

The consequences of oral step can be observed at the beginning of the gastric digestion, the first stage. As there is no enzymatic proteolytic activity at this stage, the level of H-NMR, a spectrum used to determine the structure, is still constant because there is no change going on. However, when pepsin takes action, TD-NMR, a special technique used for measuring mobile water population with macromolecular solutes, reveals that progressive unbundling of meat fibers helps pepsin activity to digest. TD-NMR data proves that bolus structure changes considerably during the first part of digestion and water molecules, consequently, leave the spaces inside the myofibrils and fiber bundles. This results in a low level of water that can be detected in duodenal stage. Since digestion is in progress, protein molecules become smaller and molecular weight gets lower, in other words, there is an increase in the spectra total area.

== See also ==
- Genomics
- Nutrigenomics
- Proteomics
- List of omics topics in biology
