= Trends in Analytical Chemistry =

- Discipline: Analytical chemistry
- Language: English
- Edited by: Janusz Pawliszyn

Publication details
- History: 1981–present
- Publisher: Elsevier
- Frequency: Monthly
- Impact factor: 13.5 (2025)

Standard abbreviations
- ISO 4: Trends Anal. Chem.

Indexing
- CODEN: TTAEDJ
- ISSN: 0165-9936
- LCCN: 82646003
- OCLC no.: 9521237

Links
- Journal homepage

Trends in Analytical Chemistry is a peer-reviewed journal in analytical chemistry with reviews of the latest developments in the field. Its editor-in-chief as of 2019 is Janusz Pawliszyn.

The 2025 impact factor is 13.5.
