= Quartz crystal microbalance with dissipation monitoring =

Scientific technique

Within surface science, a quartz crystal microbalance with dissipation monitoring (QCM-D) is a type of quartz crystal microbalance (QCM) based on the ring-down technique. It is used in interfacial acoustic sensing. Its most common application is the determination of a film thickness in a liquid environment (such as the thickness of an adsorbed protein layer). It can be used to investigate further properties of the sample, most notably the layer's softness.

== Method ==
Ring-down as a method to interrogate acoustic resonators was established in 1954. In the context of the QCM, it was described by Hirao et al. and Rodahl et al. The active component of a QCM is a thin quartz crystal disk sandwiched between a pair of electrodes. The application of an AC voltage over the electrodes causes the crystal to oscillate at its acoustic resonance frequency. When the AC voltage is turned off, the oscillation decays exponentially ("rings down"). This decay is recorded and the resonance frequency (f) and the energy dissipation factor (D) are extracted. D is defined as the loss of energy per oscillation period divided by the total energy stored in the system. D is equal to the resonance bandwidth divided by the resonance frequency. Other QCM instruments determine the bandwidth from the conductance spectra. Being a QCM, the QCM-D works in real-time, does not need labeling, and is surface-sensitive. Current QCM-D equipment enables measuring of more than 200 data points per second.

Changes in the resonance frequency (Δf) are primarily related to mass uptake or release at the sensor surface. When employed as a mass sensor, the instrument has a sensitivity of about 0.5ng/cm^{2} according to the manufacturer. Changes in the dissipation factor (ΔD) are primarily related to the viscoelasticity (softness). The softness, in turn, often is related to structural changes of the film adhering at the sensor surface.

== Mass sensor ==
When operated as a mass sensor, the QCM-D is often used to study molecular adsorption/desorption and binding kinetics to various types of surfaces. In contrast to optical techniques such as surface plasmon resonance (SPR) spectroscopy, ellipsometry, or dual polarisation interferometry, the QCM determines the mass of the adsorbed film including trapped solvent. Comparison of the "acoustic thickness" as determined with the QCM and the "optical thickness" as determined by any of the optical techniques therefore allows to estimate the degree of swelling of the film in the ambient liquid. The difference in dry and wet mass measured by QCM-D and MP-SPR is more significant in highly hydrated layers as can be seen in.

Since the softness of the sample is affected by a large variety of parameters, the QCM-D is useful for studying molecular interactions with surfaces as well as interactions between molecules. The QCM-D is commonly used in the fields of biomaterials, cell adhesion, drug discovery, materials science, and biophysics. Other typical applications are characterizing viscoelastic films, conformational changes of deposited macromolecules, build-up of polyelectrolyte multilayers, and degradation or corrosion of films and coatings.
