= Array =

Array may refer to:

== Music ==
- Array, a succession of aggregates in twelve-tone and serial composition
- Array mbira, a musical instrument
- Spiral array model, a music pitch space

== Science ==
- A telescope array or astronomical interferometer is a group of telescopes, mirror segments, or radio telescope antennas used to provide high resolution images of astronomical objects
- Microarray, a lab-on-a-chip which can measure multiple analytes

== Mathematics and statistics ==
- Standard array in coding theory
- Matrix (mathematics), a rectangular array of numbers in rows and columns
  - Costas array
  - Monge array
- Holors
- Orthogonal array
- Intersection array, a kind of regular graph

== Computing ==
- Array (data structure), an arrangement of data in computer memory
- Array (data type), used in a programming language to specify a variable that can be indexed

or various kinds of the above, such as:

- Bit array or bit vector
- Dynamic array, allocated at run time
- Jagged array, an array of member arrays which can be of different lengths
- Parallel array of records, with each field stored as a separate array
- Sparse array, with most elements omitted, to store a sparse matrix
- Variable-length array
- Associative array, an abstract data structure model composed of key-value pairs, often implemented as a hash table or search tree
- Asynchronous array of simple processors
- Disk array, such as the RAID
- Gate array, including a field-programmable gate array (FPGA)
- ICL Distributed Array Processor, an array processor for the ICL
- Integrated circuit packages:
  - Ball grid array
  - pin grid array
  - land grid array
- Processor array
- Programmable Array Logic (PAL), a systematic way to implement Boolean functions
- Reconfigurable datapath array, a flexible data processing architecture
- Systolic array, a hardware architecture
- Transistor array, an integrated circuit
- Video Graphics Array (VGA), a display adapter and many variants thereof
- Wi-Fi array, a wireless networking device

== Technology ==
- Antenna array
- Array gain, a telecommunications parameter
- Array processing of multichannel signals (not to be confused with array programming)
- Color filter array, placed over an imaging array
- Field emitter array, an electron source
- Halbach array, an arrangement of magnets
- Linear diode array used in image scanners
- Microphone array
- Parametric array of transducers
- Phased-array optics
- Photovoltaic array
- Staring array, an imaging sensor
- Towed array sonar

== Organisations ==
- ARRAY, an independent film distribution company
- Array Networks, a computer networking company
- Array Collective, a Belfast-based artist-activist collaborative project
