= Sauerbrey =

Sauerbrey or Sauerbrei or Sauerbreij may refer to:

- Anna Sauerbrey (born 1979), German journalist
- Ellen Sauerbrey (born 1937), American politician
- Frank Sauerbrey, German ski jumper
- Günter Sauerbrey (1933–2003), German physicist and researcher
- Harold Sauerbrei
- Katherine Sauerbrey (born 1997), German cross-country skier
- Nicolien Sauerbreij (born 1979), Dutch snowboarder
- Rudolf Sauerbrei (1919–2007), German Major, highly decoracted in World War II
- Ulf Sauerbrey (born 1961), German rower

== See also ==
- Sauerbrey equation, in quartz crystal microbalance invented in 1959
  - Sauerbrey constant
  - Sauerbrey layer
