= Quartz crystal microbalance =

Measurement of the change in frequency of a quartz crystal resonator

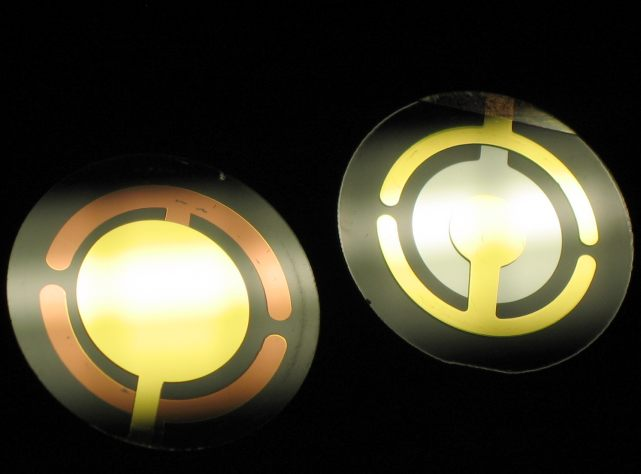
Photograph of typical quartz crystal resonators as used for QCM, metallised with gold electrodes (left: front electrode, right: back electrode) by vapor deposition.

A quartz crystal microbalance (QCM), also known as quartz microbalance (QMB) and sometimes also as quartz crystal nanobalance (QCN), measures a mass variation per unit area by measuring the change in frequency of a quartz crystal resonator. The resonance is disturbed by the addition or removal of a small mass due to oxide growth/decay or film deposition at the surface of the acoustic resonator. The QCM can be used under vacuum, in gas phase ("gas sensor", first use described by King) and more recently in liquid environments. It is useful for monitoring the rate of deposition in thin-film deposition systems under vacuum. In liquid, it is highly effective at determining the affinity of molecules (proteins, in particular) to surfaces functionalized with recognition sites. Larger entities such as viruses or polymers are investigated as well. QCM has also been used to investigate interactions between biomolecules. Frequency measurements are easily made to high precision (discussed below); hence, it is easy to measure mass densities down to a level of below 1 μg/cm^{2}. In addition to measuring the frequency, the dissipation factor (equivalent to the resonance bandwidth) is often measured to help analysis. The dissipation factor is the inverse quality factor of the resonance, Q^{−1} = w/f_{r} (see below); it quantifies the damping in the system and is related to the sample's viscoelastic properties.

== General ==
Quartz is one member of a family of crystals that experience the piezoelectric effect. The piezoelectric effect has found applications in high power sources, sensors, actuators, frequency standards, motors, etc., and the relationship between applied voltage and mechanical deformation is well known; this allows probing an acoustic resonance by electrical means. Applying alternating current to the quartz crystal will induce oscillations. With an alternating current between the electrodes of a properly cut crystal, a standing shear wave is generated. The Q factor, which is the ratio of frequency and bandwidth, can be as high as 10^{6}. Such a narrow resonance leads to highly stable oscillators and a high accuracy in the determination of the resonance frequency. The QCM exploits this ease and precision for sensing. Common equipment allows resolution down to 1 Hz on crystals with a fundamental resonant frequency in the 4 – 6 MHz range. A typical setup for the QCM contains water cooling tubes, the retaining unit, frequency sensing equipment through a microdot feed-through, an oscillation source, and a measurement and recording device.

The frequency of oscillation of the quartz crystal is partially dependent on the thickness of the crystal. During normal operation, all the other influencing variables remain constant; thus a change in thickness correlates directly to a change in frequency. As mass is deposited on the surface of the crystal, the thickness increases; consequently the frequency of oscillation decreases from the initial value. With some simplifying assumptions, this frequency change can be quantified and correlated precisely to the mass change using the Sauerbrey equation. Other techniques for measuring the properties of thin films include ellipsometry, surface plasmon resonance (SPR) spectroscopy, Multi-Parametric Surface Plasmon Resonance and dual polarisation interferometry.

== Gravimetric and non-gravimetric QCM ==
The classical sensing application of quartz crystal resonators is microgravimetry. Many commercial instruments, some of which are called thickness monitors, are available. These devices exploit the Sauerbrey relation. For thin films, the resonance frequency is usually inversely proportional to the total thickness of the plate. The latter increases when a film is deposited onto the crystal surface. Monolayer sensitivity is easily reached. However, when the film thickness increases, viscoelastic effects come into play. In the late 1980s, it was recognized that the QCM can also be operated in liquids, if proper measures are taken to overcome the consequences of the large damping. Again, viscoelastic effects contribute strongly to the resonance properties.

Today, microweighing is one of several uses of the QCM. Measurements of viscosity and more general, viscoelastic properties, are of much importance as well. The "non-gravimetric" QCM is by no means an alternative to the conventional QCM. Many researchers, who use quartz resonators for purposes other than gravimetry, have continued to call the quartz crystal resonator "QCM". Actually, the term "balance" makes sense even for non-gravimetric applications if it is understood in the sense of a force balance. At resonance, the force exerted upon the crystal by the sample is balanced by a force originating from the shear gradient inside the crystal. This is the essence of the small-load approximation.

The QCM measures inertial mass, and therefore by operating at a high resonant frequency it can be made very sensitive to small changes in that inertia as material is added to (or removed from) its surface. The sensitivity of gravitational mass measurements is, by comparison, limited by the Earth's gravitational field strength. We normally think of a balance as a way of measuring (or comparing) gravitational mass, as measured by the force that the earth exerts on the body being weighed. A few experiments have demonstrated a direct link between QCM and the SI system by comparing traceable (gravitational mass) weighings with QCM measurements.

Crystalline α–quartz is by far the most important material for thickness-shear resonators. Langasite (La_{3}Ga_{5}SiO_{14}, "LGS") and gallium-orthophosphate (GaPO_{4}) are investigated as alternatives to quartz, mainly (but not only) for use at high temperatures. Such devices are also called "QCM", even though they are not made out of quartz (and may or may not be used for gravimetry).

== Surface acoustic wave-based sensors ==
The QCM is a member of a wider class of sensing instruments based on acoustic waves at surfaces. Instruments sharing similar principles of operation are shear horizontal surface acoustic wave (SH-SAW) devices, Love-wave devices and torsional resonators. Surface acoustic wave-based devices make use of the fact that the reflectivity of an acoustic wave at the crystal surface depends on the impedance (the stress-to-speed ratio) of the adjacent medium. (Some acoustic sensors for temperature or pressure make use of the fact that the speed of sound inside the crystal depends on temperature, pressure, or bending. These sensors do not exploit surface effects.) In the context of surface-acoustic wave based sensing, the QCM is also termed "bulk acoustic wave resonator (BAW-resonator)" or "thickness-shear resonator". The displacement pattern of an unloaded BAW resonator is a standing shear wave with anti-nodes at the crystal surface. This makes the analysis particularly easy and transparent.

== Instrumental ==
=== Resonator crystals ===
When the QCM was first developed, natural quartz was harvested, selected for its quality and then cut in the lab. However, most of today's crystals are grown using seed crystals. A seed crystal serves as an anchoring point and template for crystal growth. Grown crystals are subsequently cut and polished into hair-thin discs which support thickness shear resonance in the 1-30 MHz range. The "AT" or "SC" oriented cuts (discussed below) are widely used in applications.

=== Electromechanical coupling ===
The QCM consists of a thin piezoelectric plate with electrodes evaporated onto both sides. Due to the piezo-effect, an AC voltage across the electrodes induces a shear deformation and vice versa. The electromechanical coupling provides a simple way to detect an acoustic resonance by electrical means. Otherwise, it is of minor importance. However, electromechanical coupling can have a slight influence on the resonance frequency via piezoelectric stiffening. This effect can be used for sensing, but is usually avoided. It is essential to have the electric and dielectric boundary conditions well under control. Grounding the front electrode (the electrode in contact with the sample) is one option. A π-network sometimes is employed for the same reason. A π-network is an arrangement of resistors, which almost short-circuit the two electrodes. This makes the device less susceptible to electrical perturbations.

=== Shear waves decay in liquids and gases ===
Most acoustic-wave-based sensors employ shear (transverse) waves. Shear waves decay rapidly in liquid and gaseous environments. Compressional (longitudinal) waves would be radiated into the bulk and potentially be reflected back to the crystal from the opposing cell wall. Such reflections are avoided with transverse waves. The range of penetration of a 5 MHz-shear wave in water is 250 nm. This finite penetration depth renders the QCM surface-specific. Also, liquids and gases have a rather small shear-acoustic impedance and therefore only weakly damp the oscillation. The exceptionally high Q-factors of acoustic resonators are linked to their weak coupling to the environment.

=== Modes of operation ===
Economic ways of driving a QCM make use of oscillator circuits. Oscillator circuits are also widely employed in time and frequency control applications, where the oscillator serves as a clock. Other modes of operation are impedance analysis, QCM-I, and ring-down, QCM-D. In impedance analysis, the electric conductance as a function of driving frequency is determined by means of a network analyzer. By fitting a resonance curve to the conductance curve, one obtains the frequency and bandwidth of the resonance as fit parameters. In ring-down, one measures the voltage between the electrodes after the exciting voltage has suddenly been turned off. The resonator emits a decaying sine wave, where the resonance parameters are extracted from the period of oscillation and the decay rate.

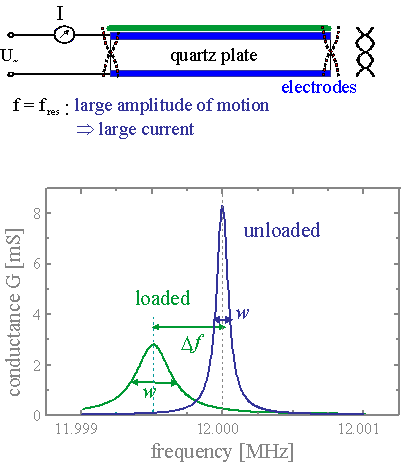
Impedance analysis is based on electrical conductance curve. The central parameters of measurement are the resonance frequency f_{res} and the bandwidth w.

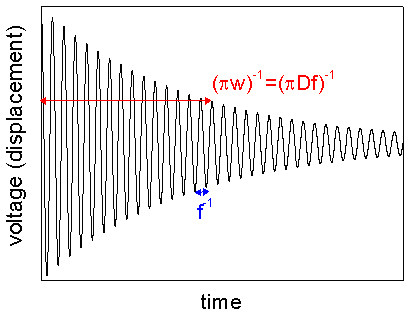
Ring-down yields the equivalent information in time-domain measurements. The dissipation factor D is equal to Q^{−1}.

=== Energy trapping ===
To avoid dissipation of vibration energy (damping the oscillation) by the crystal holder, which touches the crystal at the rim, the vibration should be confined to the center of the crystal platelet. This is known as energy trapping.

For crystals with high frequencies (10 MHz and higher), the electrodes at the front and the back of the crystal usually are key-hole shaped, thereby making the resonator thicker in the center than at the rim. The mass of the electrodes confines the displacement field to the center of the crystal disk. QCM crystals with vibration frequencies around 5 or 6 MHz usually have a planoconvex shape; at the rim the crystal is too thin for a standing wave with the resonance frequency. Thus, in both cases the thickness-shear vibration amplitude is greatest at the center of the disk. This means that the mass-sensitivity is peaked at the center also, with this sensitivity declining smoothly to zero towards the rim (For high-frequency crystals, the amplitude vanishes already somewhat outside the perimeter of the smallest electrode.) The mass-sensitivity is therefore very non-uniform across the crystal surface, and this non-uniformity is a function of the mass-distribution of the metal electrodes (or in the case of non-planar resonators, the quartz crystal thickness itself).

Energy trapping slightly distorts the otherwise planar wave fronts. The deviation from the plane thickness-shear mode entails flexural contribution to the displacement pattern. If the crystal is not operated in vacuum, flexural waves emit compressional waves into the adjacent medium, which is a problem when operating the crystal in a liquid environment. Standing compressional waves form in the liquid between the crystals and the container walls (or the liquid surface); these waves modify both the frequency and the damping of the crystal resonator.

=== Overtones ===
Planar resonators can be operated at a number of overtones, typically indexed by the number of nodal planes parallel to the crystal surfaces. Only odd harmonics can be excited electrically because only these induce charges of opposite sign at the two crystal surfaces. Overtones are to be distinguished from anharmonic side bands (spurious modes), which have nodal planes perpendicular to the plane of the resonator. The best agreement between theory and experiment is reached with planar, optically polished crystals for overtone orders between n = 5 and n = 13. On low harmonics, energy trapping is insufficient, while on high harmonics, anharmonic side bands interfere with the main resonance.

=== Amplitude of motion ===
The amplitude of lateral displacement rarely exceeds a nanometer. More specifically one has

$u_0=\frac 4{\left( n\pi \right) ^2}dQU_{\mathrm{el}}$

with u_{0} the amplitude of lateral displacement, n the overtone order, d the piezoelectric strain coefficient, Q the quality factor, and U_{el} the amplitude of electrical driving. The piezoelectric strain coefficient is given as d = 3.1·10^{‑12} m/V for AT-cut quartz crystals. Due to the small amplitude, stress and strain usually are proportional to each other. The QCM operates in the range of linear acoustics.

=== Effects of temperature and stress ===
The resonance frequency of acoustic resonators depends on temperature, pressure, and bending stress. Temperature-frequency coupling is minimized by employing special crystal cuts. A widely used temperature-compensated cut of quartz is the AT-cut. Careful control of temperature and stress is essential in the operation of the QCM.

AT-cut crystals are singularly rotated Y-axis cuts in which the top and bottom half of the crystal move in opposite directions (thickness shear vibration) during oscillation. The AT-cut crystal is easily manufactured. However, it has limitations at high and low temperature, as it is easily disrupted by internal stresses caused by temperature gradients in these temperature extremes (relative to room temperature, ~25 °C). These internal stress points produce undesirable frequency shifts in the crystal, decreasing its accuracy. The relationship between temperature and frequency is cubic. The cubic relationship has an inflection point near room temperature. As a consequence the AT-cut quartz crystal is most effective when operating at or near room temperature. For applications which are above room temperature, water cooling is often helpful.

Stress-compensated (SC) crystals are available with a doubly rotated cut that minimizes the frequency changes due to temperature gradients when the system is operating at high temperatures, and reduces the reliance on water cooling. SC-cut crystals have an inflection point of ~92 °C. In addition to their high temperature inflection point, they also have a smoother cubic relationship and are less affected by temperature deviations from the inflection point. However, due to the more difficult manufacturing process, they are more expensive and are not widely commercially available.

=== Electrochemical QCM ===
The QCM can be combined with other surface-analytical instruments. The electrochemical QCM (EQCM) is particularly advanced. Using the EQCM, one determines the ratio of mass deposited at the electrode surface during an electrochemical reaction to the total charge passed through the electrode. This ratio is called the current efficiency.

== Quantification of dissipative processes ==
For advanced QCMs, such as QCM-I and QCM-D, both the resonance frequency, f_{r}, and the bandwidth, w, are available for analysis. The latter quantifies processes which withdraw energy from the oscillation. These may include damping by the holder and ohmic losses inside the electrode or the crystal. In the literature some parameters other than w itself are used to quantify bandwidth. The Q-factor (quality factor) is given by Q = f_{r}/w. The “dissipation factor”, D, is the inverse of the Q-factor: D = Q^{−1} = w/f_{r}. The half-band-half-width, Γ, is Γ = w/2. The use of Γ is motivated by a complex formulation of the equations governing the motion of the crystal. A complex resonance frequency is defined as f_{r}^{*} = f_{r} + iΓ, where the imaginary part, Γ, is half the bandwidth at half maximum. Using a complex notation, one can treat shifts of frequency, Δf, and bandwidth, ΔΓ, within the same set of (complex) equations.

The motional resistance of the resonator, R_{1}, is also used as a measure of dissipation. R_{1} is an output parameter of some instruments based on advanced oscillator circuits. R_{1} usually is not strictly proportional to the bandwidth (although it should be according to the BvD circuit; see below). Also, in absolute terms, R_{1} – being an electrical quantity and not a frequency – is more severely affected by calibration problems than the bandwidth.

== Equivalent circuits ==
Modeling of acoustic resonators often occurs with equivalent electrical circuits. Equivalent circuits are algebraically equivalent to the continuum mechanics description and to a description in terms of acoustic reflectivities. They provide for a graphical representation of the resonator's properties and their shifts upon loading. These representations are not just cartoons. They are tools to predict the shift of the resonance parameters in response to the addition of the load.

Equivalent circuits build on the electromechanical analogy. In the same way as the current through a network of resistors can be predicted from their arrangement and the applied voltage, the displacement of a network of mechanical elements can be predicted from the topology of the network and the applied force. The electro-mechanical analogy maps forces onto voltages and speeds onto currents. The ratio of force and speed is termed "mechanical impedance". Note: Here, speed means the time derivative of a displacement, not the speed of sound. There also is an electro-acoustic analogy, within which stresses (rather than forces) are mapped onto voltages. In acoustics, forces are normalized to area. The ratio of stress and speed should not be called "acoustic impedance" (in analogy to the mechanical impedance) because this term is already in use for the material property Z_{ac} = ρc with ρ the density and c the speed of sound). The ratio of stress and speed at the crystal surface is called load impedance, Z_{L}. Synonymous terms are "surface impedance" and "acoustic load." The load impedance is in general not equal to the material constant Z_{ac} = ρc = (Gρ)^{1/2}. Only for propagating plane waves are the values of Z_{L} and Z_{ac} the same.

The electro-mechanical analogy provides for mechanical equivalents of a resistor, an inductance, and a capacitance, which are the dashpot (quantified by the drag coefficient, ξ_{p}), the point mass (quantified by the mass, m_{p}), and the spring (quantified by the spring constant, κ_{p}). For a dashpot, the impedance by definition is Z_{m}=F / (du/dt)=ξ_{m} with F the force and (du/dt) the speed). For a point mass undergoing oscillatory motion u(t) = u_{0} exp(iωt) we have Z_{m} = iωm_{p}. The spring obeys Z_{m} =κ_{p}/(iω). Piezoelectric coupling is depicted as a transformer. It is characterized by a parameter φ. While φ is dimensionless for usual transformers (the turns ratio), it has the dimension charge/length in the case of electromechanical coupling. The transformer acts as an impedance converter in the sense that a mechanical impedance, Z_{m}, appears as an electrical impedance, Z_{el}, across the electrical ports. Z_{el} is given by Z_{el} = φ^{2} Z_{m}. For planar piezoelectric crystals, φ takes the value φ = Ae/d_{q}, where A is the effective area, e is the piezoelectric stress coefficient (e = 9.65·10^{−2} C/m^{2} for AT-cut quartz) and d_{q} is the thickness of the plate. The transformer often is not explicitly depicted. Rather, the mechanical elements are directly depicted as electrical elements (capacitor replaces a spring, etc.).

There is a pitfall with the application of the electro-mechanical analogy, which has to do with how networks are drawn. When a spring pulls onto a dashpot, one would usually draw the two elements in series. However, when applying the electro-mechanical analogy, the two elements have to be placed in parallel. For two parallel electrical elements the currents are additive. Since the speeds (= currents) add when placing a spring behind a dashpot, this assembly has to be represented by a parallel network.

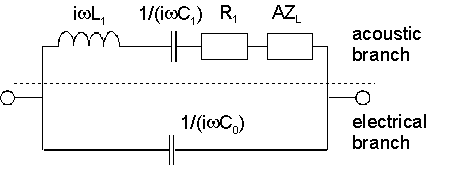
Butterworth-van-Dyke (BvD) equivalent circuit. C_{0} is the electrical (parallel) capacitance across the electrodes. L_{1} is the motional inductance (proportional to the mass). C_{1} is the motional capacitance (inversely proportional to the stiffness) and R_{1} is the motional resistance (quantifying dissipative losses). A is the effective area of the crystal and Z_{L} is the load impedance.

The figure on the right shows the Butterworth-van Dyke (BvD) equivalent circuit. The acoustic properties of the crystal are represented by the motional inductance, L_{1}, the motional capacitance, C_{1}, and the motional resistance R_{1}. Z_{L} is the load impedance. Note that the load, Z_{L}, cannot be determined from a single measurement. It is inferred from the comparison of the loaded and the unloaded state. Some authors use the BvD circuit without the load Z_{L}. This circuit is also called “four element network”. The values of L_{1}, C_{1}, and R_{1} then change their value in the presence of the load (they do not if the element Z_{L} is explicitly included).

== Small-load approximation ==
The BvD circuit predicts the resonance parameters. One can show that the following simple relation holds as long as the frequency shift is much smaller than the frequency itself:

$\frac{\Delta f^{*}}{f_f}=\frac i{\pi Z_q}Z_L$

f_{f} is the frequency of the fundamental. Z_{q} is the acoustic impedance of material. For AT-cut quartz, its value is Z_{q} = 8.8·10^{6} kg m^{−2} s^{−1}.

The small-load approximation is central to the interpretation of QCM-data. It holds for arbitrary samples and can be applied in an average sense. (Note: Heterogeneous samples will, in general, lead to scattering of acoustic waves, which is not captured by just calculating the average stress.) Assume that the sample is a complex material, such as a cell culture, a sand pile, a froth, an assembly of spheres or vesicles, or a droplet. If the average stress-to-speed ratio of the sample at the crystal surface (the load impedance, Z_{L}) can be calculated in one way or another, a quantitative analysis of the QCM experiment is in reach. Otherwise, the interpretation will have to remain qualitative.

The limits of the small-load approximation are noticed either when the frequency shift is large or when the overtone-dependence of Δf and Δ(w/2) is analyzed in detail in order to derive the viscoelastic properties of the sample. A more general relation is

$Z_L=-iZ_q\tan \left( \pi \frac{\Delta f}{f_f}\right)$

This equation is implicit in Δf^{*}, and must be solved numerically. Approximate solutions also exist, which go beyond the small-load approximation. The small-load approximation is the first order solution of a perturbation analysis.

The definition of the load impedance implicitly assumes that stress and speed are proportional and that the ratio therefore is independent of speed. This assumption is justified when the crystal is operated in liquids and in air. The laws of linear acoustics then hold. However, when the crystal is in contact with a rough surface, stress can easily become a nonlinear function of strain (and speed) because the stress is transmitted across a finite number of rather small load-bearing asperities. The stress at the points of contact is high, and phenomena like slip, partial slip, yield, etc. set in. These are part of non-linear acoustics. There is a generalization of the small-load equation dealing with this problem. If the stress, σ(t), is periodic in time and synchronous with the crystal oscillation one has

$\frac{\Delta f}{f_f}=\frac 1{\pi Z_q}\,\frac 2{\omega u_0}\left\langle \sigma \left( t\right) \cos \left( \omega t\right) \right\rangle _t$

$\frac{\Delta (w/2) }{f_f}=\frac 1{\pi Z_q}\,\frac 2{\omega u_0}\left\langle \sigma \left( t\right) \sin \left( \omega t\right) \right\rangle _t$

Angular brackets denote a time average and σ(t) is the (small) stress exerted by the external surface. The function σ(t) may or may not be harmonic. One can always test for nonlinear behavior by checking for a dependence of the resonance parameters on the driving voltage. If linear acoustics hold, there is no drive level-dependence. Note, however, that quartz crystals have an intrinsic drive level-dependence, which must not be confused with nonlinear interactions between the crystal and the sample.

== Viscoelastic modeling ==
=== Assumptions ===
For a number of experimental configurations, there are explicit expressions relating the shifts of frequency and bandwidth to the sample properties. The assumptions underlying the equations are the following:

- The resonator and all cover layers are laterally homogeneous and infinite.
- The distortion of the crystal is given by a transverse plane wave with the wave-vector perpendicular to the surface normal (thickness-shear mode). There are neither compressional waves nor flexural contributions to the displacement pattern. There are no nodal lines in the plane of the resonator.
- All stresses are proportional to strain. Linear viscoelasticity holds.
- Piezoelectric stiffening may be ignored.

=== Semi-infinite viscoelastic medium ===
For a semi-infinite medium, one has

$\frac{\Delta f^{*}}{f_f}=\frac i{\pi Z_q}\,\frac \sigma {\dot{u}}=\frac i{\pi Z_q}Z_{\mathrm{ac}}=\frac i{\pi Z_q}\sqrt{\rho i\omega \eta }$

$=\frac 1{\pi Z_q}\,\frac{-1+i}{\sqrt{2}}\sqrt{\rho \omega \left( \eta ^{\prime }-i\eta ^{\prime \prime }\right) }=\frac i{\pi Z_q} \sqrt{\rho \left( G^{\prime }+iG^{\prime \prime }\right) }$

η’ and η’’ are the real and the imaginary part of the viscosity, respectively. Z_{ac} = ρc =(G ρ)^{1/2} is the acoustic impedance of the medium. ρ is the density, c, the speed of sound, and G = i ωη is the shear modulus. For Newtonian liquids (η’ = const, η’’ = 0), Δf and Δ(w/2) are equal and opposite. They scale as the square root of the overtone order, n^{1/2}. For viscoelastic liquids (η’ = η(ω), η’’≠ 0), the complex viscosity can be obtained as

$\eta ^{\prime }=-\frac{\pi Z_q^2}{\rho _{\mathrm{Liq}}\,f}\,\frac{\Delta f\Delta \left( w/2\right) }{f_f^2}$

$\eta ^{\prime \prime }=\frac 12\frac{\pi Z_q^2}{\rho _{\mathrm{Liq}}\,f}\,\frac{\left( \left( \Delta \left( w/2\right) \right) ^2-\Delta f^2\right) }{f_f^2}$

Importantly, the QCM only probes the region close to the crystal surface. The shear wave evanescently decays into the liquid. In water the penetration depth is about 250 nm at 5 MHz. Surface roughness, nano-bubbles at the surface, slip, and compressional waves can interfere with the measurement of viscosity. Also, the viscosity determined at MHz frequencies sometimes differs from the low-frequency viscosity. In this respect, torsional resonators (with a frequency around 100 kHz) are closer to application than thickness-shear resonators.

=== Inertial loading (Sauerbrey equation) ===
The frequency shift induced by a thin sample which is rigidly coupled to the crystal (such as a thin film), is described by the Sauerbrey equation. The stress is governed by inertia, which implies σ = -ω^{2}u_{0}m_{F}, where u_{0} is the amplitude of oscillation and m_{F} is the (average) mass per unit area. Inserting this result into the small-load-approximation one finds

$\frac{\Delta f^{*}}{f_f}\approx \frac i{\pi Z_q}\frac{-\omega ^2u_0m_{\mathrm{F}}}{i\omega u_0}=-\frac{2\,f}{Z_q}m_{\mathrm{F}}$

If the density of the film is known, one can convert from mass per unit area, m_{F}, to thickness, d_{F}. The thickness thus derived is also called the Sauerbrey thickness to show that it was derived by applying the Sauerbrey equation to the frequency shift. The shift in bandwidth is zero if the Sauerbrey equation holds. Checking for the bandwidth therefore amounts to checking the applicability of the Sauerbrey equation.

The Sauerbrey equation was first derived by Günter Sauerbrey in 1959 and correlates changes in the oscillation frequency of a piezoelectric crystal with mass deposited on it. He simultaneously developed a method for measuring the resonance frequency and its changes by using the crystal as the frequency-determining component of an oscillator circuit. His method continues to be used as the primary tool in quartz crystal microbalance experiments for conversion of frequency to mass.

Because the film is treated as an extension of thickness, Sauerbrey’s equation only applies to systems in which (a) the deposited mass has the same acoustic properties as the crystal and (b) the frequency change is small (Δf / f < 0.05).

If the change in frequency is greater than 5%, that is, Δf / f > 0.05, the Z-match method must be used to determine the change in mass. The formula for the Z-match method is:

$\tan \left( \frac{\pi \Delta f}{f_f}\right) =\frac{-Z_{\mathrm{F}}}{Z_q}\tan \left( k_{\mathrm{F}}d_{\mathrm{F}}\right)$

k_{F} is the wave vector inside the film and d_{F} its thickness. Inserting k_{F} = 2·π·f /c_{F} = 2·π·f·ρ_{F} / Z_{F} as well as d_{F} = m_{F} / ρ_{F} yields

$\Delta f=-\frac{f_f}\pi \left( \arctan \frac{Z_{\mathrm{F}}}{Z_q}\tan \left( \frac{2\pi f}{Z_{\mathrm{F}}}m_{\mathrm{F}}\right) \right)$

=== Viscoelastic film ===
For a viscoelastic film, the frequency shift is

$\frac{\Delta f^{*}}{f_f}=\frac{-1}{\pi Z_q}Z_{\mathrm{F}}\tan \left( k_{\mathrm{F}}d_{\mathrm{F}}\right)$

Here Z_{F} is the acoustic impedance of the film (Z_{F} = ρ_{F}c_{F} = (ρ_{F}G_{f})^{1/2})= (ρ_{F}/J_{f})^{1/2}), k_{F} is the wave vector and d_{F} is the film thickness. J_{f} is the film's viscoelastic compliance, ρ_{F} is the density.

The poles of the tangent (k_{F} d_{F} = π/2) define the film resonances. At the film resonance, one has d_{F} = λ/4. The agreement between experiment and theory is often poor close to the film resonance. Typically, the QCM only works well for film thicknesses much less than a quarter of the wavelength of sound (corresponding to a few micrometres, depending on the softness of the film and the overtone order).

Note that the properties of a film as determined with the QCM are fully specified by two parameters, which are its acoustic impedance, Z_{F} = ρ_{F}c_{F} and its mass per unit area, m_{F} = d_{F}·ρ_{F}. The wave number k_{F} = ω/c_{F} is not algebraically independent from Z_{F} and m_{F}. Unless the density of the film is known independently, the QCM can only measure mass per unit area, never the geometric thickness itself.

=== Viscoelastic film in liquid ===
For a film immersed in a liquid environment, the frequency shift is

$\frac{\Delta f^{*}}{f_f}=\frac{-Z_{\mathrm{F}}}{\pi Z_q}\frac{Z_{\mathrm{F}}\tan \left( k_{\mathrm{F}}d_{\mathrm{F}}\right) -iZ_{\mathrm{Liq}}}{Z_{\mathrm{F}}+iZ_{\mathrm{Liq}}\tan \left( k_{\mathrm{F}}d_{\mathrm{F}}\right) }$

The indices F and Liq denote the film and the liquid. Here, the reference state is the crystal immersed in liquid (but not covered with a film). For thin films, one can Taylor-expand the above equation to first order in d_{F}, yielding

$\frac{\Delta f^{*}}{f_f}=\frac{-\omega m_{\mathrm{F}}}{\pi Z_q}\left( 1-\frac{Z_{ \mathrm{Liq}}^2}{Z_{\mathrm{F}}^2}\right)=\frac{-\omega m_{\mathrm{F}}}{\pi Z_q}\left( 1-J_{\mathrm{F}}\frac{Z_{\mathrm{Liq}}^2}{\rho_{\mathrm{F}}}\right)$

Apart from the term in brackets, this equation is equivalent to the Sauerbrey equation. The term in brackets is a viscoelastic correction, dealing with the fact that in liquids, soft layers lead to a smaller Sauerbrey thickness than rigid layers.

=== Derivation of viscoelastic constants ===
The frequency shift depends on the acoustic impedance of the material; the latter in turn depends on the viscoelastic properties of the material. Therefore, in principle, one can derive the complex shear modulus (or equivalently, the complex viscosity). However, there are certain caveats to be kept in mind:

- The viscoelastic parameters themselves usually depend on frequency (and therefore on the overtone order).
- It is often difficult to disentangle effects of inertia and viscoelasticity. Unless the film thickness is known independently, it is difficult to obtain unique fitting results.
- Electrode effects can be of importance.
- For films in air, the small-load approximation must be replaced by the corresponding results from perturbation theory unless the films are very soft.

For thin films in liquids, there is an approximate analytical result, relating the elastic compliance of the film, J_{F}’ to the ratio of Δ(w/2); and Δf. The shear compliance is the inverse of the shear modulus, G. In the thin-film limit, the ratio of Δ(w/2) and –Δf is independent of film thickness. It is an intrinsic property of the film. One has

$\frac{\Delta \left( \omega /2\right) }{-\Delta f}\approx \eta \omega J_F^{\,\prime }$

For thin films in air an analogous analytical result is

$\Delta \left( \omega /2\right) =\frac 8{3\rho _{\mathrm{F}}Z_q}f_f^{\,4}m_{ \mathrm{F}}^3n^3\pi ^2J^{\prime \prime }$

Here J’’ is the viscous shear compliance.

=== Interpretation of the Sauerbrey thickness ===
The correct interpretation of the frequency shift from QCM experiments in liquids is a challenge. Practitioners often just apply the Sauerbrey equation to their data and term the resulting areal mass (mass per unit area) the "Sauerbrey mass" and the corresponding thickness "Sauerbrey thickness". Even though the Sauerbrey thickness can certainly serve to compare different experiments, it must not be naively identified with the geometric thickness. Worthwhile considerations are the following:

a) The QCM always measures an areal mass density, never a geometric thickness. The conversion from areal mass density to thickness usually requires the physical density as an independent input.

b) It is difficult to infer the viscoelastic correction factor from QCM data. However, if the correction factor differs significantly from unity, it may be expected that it affects the bandwidth Δ(w/2) and also that it depends on overtone order. If, conversely, such effects are absent (Δ(w/2) « Δf, Sauerbrey thickness same on all overtone orders) one may assume that (1-Z_{Liq}^{2}/Z_{F}^{2})≈1.

c) Complex samples are often laterally heterogeneous.

d) Complex samples often have fuzzy interfaces. A "fluffy" interface will often lead to a viscoelastic correction and, as a consequence, to a non-zero Δ(w/2) as well as an overtone-dependent Sauerbrey mass. In the absence of such effects, one may conclude that the outer interface of film is sharp.

e) When the viscoelastic correction, as discussed in (b), is insignificant, this does by no means imply that the film is not swollen by the solvent. It only means that the (swollen) film is much more rigid than the ambient liquid. QCM data taken on the wet sample alone do not allow inference of the degree of swelling. The amount of swelling can be inferred from the comparison of the wet and the dry thickness. The degree of swelling is also accessible by comparing the acoustic thickness (in the Sauerbrey sense) to the optical thickness as determined by, for example, surface plasmon resonance (SPR) spectroscopy or ellipsometry. Solvent contained in the film usually does contribute to the acoustic thickness (because it takes part in the movement), whereas it does not contribute to the optic thickness (because the electronic polarizability of a solvent molecule does not change when it is located inside a film). The difference in dry and wet mass is shown with QCM-D and MP-SPR for instance in protein adsorption on nanocellulose and in other soft materials.

== Point contacts ==
The equations concerning viscoelastic properties assume planar layer systems. A frequency shift is also induced when the crystal makes contact with discrete objects across small, load-bearing asperities. Such contacts are often encountered with rough surfaces. It is assumed that the stress–speed ratio may be replaced by an average stress–speed ratio, where the average stress just is the lateral force divided by the active area of the crystal.

Often, the external object is so heavy that it does not take part in the MHz oscillation of the crystal due to inertia. It then rests in place in the laboratory frame. When the crystal surface is laterally displaced, the contact exerts a restoring force upon the crystal surface. The stress is proportional to the number density of the contacts, N_{S}, and their average spring constant, κ_{S}. The spring constant may be complex (κ_{S}^{*} = κ_{S}’ + iκ_{S}’’), where the imaginary part quantifies a withdrawal of energy from the crystal oscillation (for instance due to viscoelastic effects). For such a situation, the small-load approximation predicts

$\frac{\Delta f^{*}}{f_f}=\frac{N_S}{\pi Z_q}\frac{\kappa _S^{*}}\omega$

The QCM allows for non-destructive testing of the shear stiffness of multi-asperity contacts.

== See also ==
- Sauerbrey equation
- Sauerbrey constant
- Sauerbrey layer
- Weighing scale
- Piezoelectricity
- Thin-film thickness monitor
- Quartz crystal microbalance with dissipation monitoring (QCM-D)
- Tapered element oscillating microbalance (TEOM)
