= Thin-film thickness monitor =

Thin-film thickness monitors, deposition rate controllers, and so on, are a family of instruments used in high and ultra-high vacuum systems. They can measure the thickness of a thin film, not only after it has been made, but while it is still being deposited, and some can control either the final thickness of the film, the rate at which it is deposited, or both. Not surprisingly, the devices which control some aspect of the process tend to be called controllers, and those that simply monitor the process tend to be called monitors.

Most such instruments use a quartz crystal microbalance as the sensor. Optical measurements are sometimes used; this may be especially appropriate if the film being deposited is part of a thin film optical device.

A thickness monitor measures how much material is deposited on its sensor. Most deposition processes are at least somewhat directional. The sensor and the sample generally cannot be in the same direction from the deposition source (if they were, the one closer to the source would shadow the other), and may not even be at the same distance from it. Therefore, the rate at which the material is deposited on the sensor may not equal the rate at which it is deposited on the sample. The ratio of the two rates is sometimes called the "tooling factor". For careful work, the tooling factor should be checked by measuring the amount of material deposited on some samples after the fact and comparing it to what the thickness monitor measured. Fizeau interferometers are often used to do this. Many other techniques might be used, depending on the thickness and characteristics of the thin film, including surface profilers, ellipsometry, dual polarisation interferometry and scanning electron microscopy of cross-sections of the sample. Many thickness monitors and controllers allow tooling factors to be entered into the device before deposition begins.

The correct tooling factor can be calculated as follows:

$F_m = F_i \, \frac{T_m}{T_i}$

where F_{i} is the initial tooling factor, T_{i} is the film thickness indicated by the instrument, and T_{m} is the actual, independently measured thickness of the deposited film. If no tooling factor has been preset or used before, F_{i} equals 1.
