= Spreeta =

Spreeta is an electro-optical device utilizing surface plasmon resonance to detect small changes in refractive index of liquids. The Spreeta device was developed by Texas Instruments, Inc. in the 1990s. Device design incorporates a light-emitting diode (LED) illuminating a thin metal film (usually gold) in the Kretchmann geometry (needed to excite surface plasmons). The reflected light is detected by a photodiode linear array (which translates angle of reflection to pixel position) and the resonance (a dip in the reflectivity at a specific angle of incidence) denotes the refractive index on the outer surface of the metal film. Applications include real-time measurement of binding of antigens to antibodies attached to the sensor surface, monitoring changes in oil quality, and measuring sugar content in drinks (Brix level).

The term "Spreeta" is an anglic derivative of SPR-ITA, which combines SPR (for Surface Plasmon Resonance) with "ita" (a Spanish suffix meaning "small").

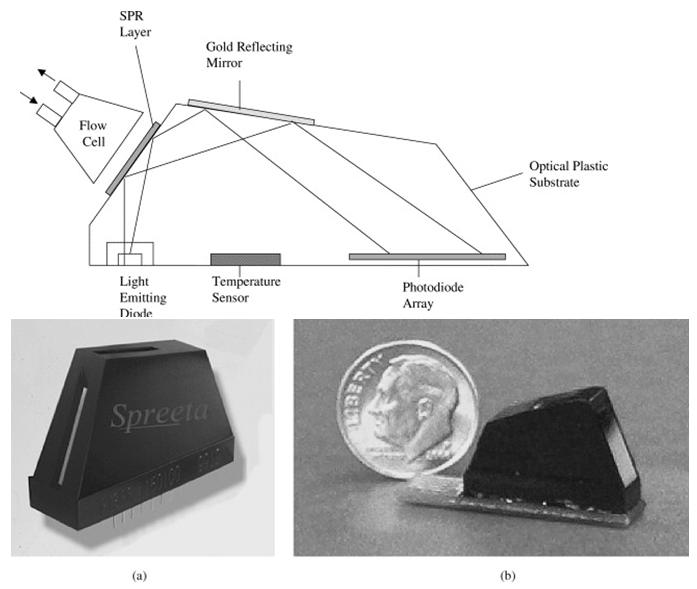
The top image shows an optical diagram of the sensor (in cross-section). The lower-left image is the original integrated sensor. The lower-right image is a smaller version of the sensor with less sensitivity but more amiable to system integration.

== Applications and evaluation ==
Due to its compact design and sensitivity to changes in liquid refractive indices, the Spreeta sensor was evaluated for various field-screening applications, including the detection of environmental contaminants and trace explosives like TNT in soil samples. Independent evaluations—such as those conducted by the United States Environmental Protection Agency (EPA) and the Department of Defense tested the device's accuracy and field reliability for rapid environmental monitoring.
