= QCM =

QCM may refer to:

- Qualcomm, a multinational corporation based in the U.S.
- Quality Capital Management, a UK-based hedge fund specialising in managed futures.
- Quartz crystal microbalance, a weighing instrument which measures a mass per unit area by measuring the change in frequency of a quartz crystal resonator
- Quad City Mallards, a former ECHL team that played in the Quad Cities area of Illinois
- Quality Control Music, an American record label
- Quotations from Chairman Mao, a Chinese book about Mao Zedong thought.
