= Structure–activity relationship =

Relationship between a compound's chemical structure and its biological activity

The structure–activity relationship (SAR) is the relationship between the chemical structure of a molecule and its biological activity. This idea was first presented by Alexander Crum Brown and Thomas Richard Fraser at least as early as 1868.

The analysis of SAR enables the determination of the chemical group responsible for evoking a target biological effect in the organism. This allows modification of the effect or the potency of a bioactive compound (typically a drug) by changing its chemical structure. Medicinal chemists use the techniques of chemical synthesis to insert new chemical groups into the biomedical compound and test the modifications for their biological effects.

This method was refined to build mathematical relationships between the chemical structure and the biological activity, known as quantitative structure–activity relationships (QSAR). A related term is structure affinity relationship (SAFIR).

== Structure-biodegradability relationship ==
The large number of synthetic organic chemicals currently in production presents a major challenge for timely collection of detailed environmental data on each compound. The concept of structure biodegradability relationships (SBR) has been applied to explain variability in persistence among organic chemicals in the environment. Early attempts generally consisted of examining the degradation of a homologous series of structurally related compounds under identical conditions with a complex "universal" inoculum, typically derived from numerous sources. This approach revealed that the nature and positions of substituents affected the apparent biodegradability of several chemical classes, with resulting general themes, such as halogens generally conferring persistence under aerobic conditions. Subsequently, more quantitative approaches have been developed using principles of QSAR and often accounting for the role of sorption (bioavailability) in chemical fate.

== See also ==
- Combinatorial chemistry
- Congener
- Conformation activity relationship
- Quantitative structure–activity relationship
- Pharmacophore
