= Surface plasmon resonance microscopy =

Surface plasmon resonance microscopy (SPRM), also called surface plasmon resonance imaging (SPRI), is a label free analytical tool that combines the surface plasmon resonance of metallic surfaces with imaging of the metallic surface. The heterogeneity of the refractive index of the metallic surface imparts high contrast images, caused by the shift in the resonance angle. SPRM can achieve a sub-nanometer thickness sensitivity and lateral resolution achieves values of micrometer scale. SPRM is used to characterize surfaces such as self-assembled monolayers, multilayer films, metal nanoparticles, oligonucleotide arrays, and binding and reduction reactions. Surface plasmon polaritons are surface electromagnetic waves coupled to oscillating free electrons of a metallic surface that propagate along a metal/dielectric interface. Since polaritons are highly sensitive to small changes in the refractive index of the metallic material, it can be used as a biosensing tool that does not require labeling. SPRM measurements can be made in real-time, such as measuring binding kinetics of membrane proteins in single cells, or DNA hybridization.

== History ==
The concept of classical SPR has been since 1968 but the SPR imaging technique was introduced in 1988 by Rothenhäusler and Knoll. Capturing a high resolution image of low contrast samples for optical measuring techniques is a near impossible task until the introduction of SPRM technique that came into existence in the year 1988. In SPRM technique, plasmon surface polariton (PSP) waves are used for illumination. In simple words, SPRI technology is an advanced version of classical SPR analysis, where the sample is monitored without label through the use of a CCD camera. The SPRI technology with the aid of CCD camera gives advantage of recording the sensograms and SPR images, and simultaneously analyzes hundreds of interactions.

== Principles ==
Surface plasmons or surface plasmon polaritons are generated by coupling of electrical field with free electrons in a metal. SPR waves propagate along the interface between dielectrics and a conducting layer rich in free electrons.

As shown in Figure 2, when light passes from a medium of high refractive index to a second medium with a lower refractive index, the light is totally reflected under certain conditions.

In order to get total internal reflection (TIR), the θ_{1} and θ_{2} should be within a certain range that can be explained through the Snell's law. When light passes through a high refractive index media to a lower refractive media, it is reflected at an angle θ_{2}, which is defined in Equation 1.

$\theta_2 = \sin^{-1}\left( \frac{\eta_1}{\eta_2} \sin\theta_1 \right)$	Eq. 1

Figure 2. Total internal reflection (TIR), an incident beam of light with angle θ_{1}, is passing through a medium with refractive index η_{1}, the beam reflects back at angle θ_{2}, when the refractive index of the medium changes to a value η_{2}.

In the TIR process some portion of the reflected light leaks a small portion of electrical field intensity into medium 2 (η_{1} > η_{2}). The light leaked into the medium 2 penetrates as an evanescent wave. The intensity and penetration depth of the evanescent wave can be calculated according to Equations 2 and 3, respectively.

$I_z = I_0 \exp\left( \frac{-z}{d_p} \right)$	Eq. 2

$d_p = \frac \lambda {4\pi\sqrt{\eta_1^2 \sin^2 \theta_1 - \eta_2^2}}$	Eq. 3

Figure 3 shows a schematic representation of surface plasmons coupled to electron density oscillations. The light wave is trapped on the surface of the metal layer by collective coupling to the electrons of the metal surface. When the electron's plasma and the electric field of the wave light couple their frequency oscillations they enters into resonance.

Figure 3. Cartoon of polaritons propagation along a metal dielectric interface, rich and poor electron density regions are referred as + and –, respectively.

Recently, the leakage light inside of the metal surface had been imaged. Radiation of different wavelengths (green, red and blue) was converted into surface plasmon polaritons, through the interaction of the photons at the metal/dielectric interface. Two different metal surfaces were used; gold and silver. The propagation length of the SPP along the x-y plane (metal plane) in each metal and photon wavelength were compared. The propagation length is defined as the distance traveled by the SPP along the metal before its intensity decreases by a factor of 1/e, as defined in Equation 4.

Figure 4 shows the leakage light captured by a color CCD camera, of the green, red and blue photons in gold (a) and silver (b) films. In part c) of Figure 4, the intensity of the surface plasmon polaritons with the distance is shown. It was determined that the leakage light intensity is proportional to the intensity in the waveguide.

$\delta_\text{SPP} \approx \lambda_0 \left\{ \frac{(\varepsilon_n')^2}{2\pi\varepsilon_m''} \right\}$	Eq. 4

where δ_{SPP} is the propagation length; ε'm and ε″m are the relative permittivity of the metal and λ0 is the free space wavelength.

The metallic film is capable of absorbing light due to the coherent oscillation of the conduction band electrons induced by the interaction with an electromagnetic field. Electrons in the conduction band induce polarization after interaction with the electric field of the radiation. A net charge difference is created in the surface of the metal film, creating a collective dipolar oscillation of electrons with the same phase. When the electron motion matches the frequency of the electromagnetic field, the absorption of incident radiation occurs. The oscillation frequency of gold surface plasmons is found in the visible region of the electromagnetic spectrum, giving a red color while silver gives yellow color. Nanorods exhibit two absorption peaks in the UV-vis region due to longitudinal and transversal oscillation, for gold nanorods the transverse oscillation generates a peak at 520 nm, while the longitudinal oscillation generates absorption at longer wavelengths, within a range of 600 to 800 nm. Silver nanoparticles shift their light absorption wavelengths to higher energy levels, where the blue shifting goes from 408 nm to 380 nm, and 372 nm, when they change from sphere to rod and wire, respectively. The absorption intensity and wavelength of gold and silver depends on the size and shape of the particles.

In Figure 5, the size and shape of silver nanoparticles influenced the intensity of the scattered light and maximum wavelength of silver nanoparticles. The triangular shaped particles appear red with a maximum scattered light at 670–680 nm, the pentagonal particles appear in green (620–630 nm) and the spherical particles have higher absorption energies (440–450 nm), appear in blue.

=== Plasmon excitation methods ===
Surface plasmon polaritons are quasiparticles, composed by electromagnetic waves-coupled to free electrons of the conduction band of metals. One of widely used methods uses to couple p-polarized light with the metal-dielectric interface is prism-based coupling. Prism couplers are the most widely used to excite surface plasmon polaritons. This method is also called Kretschmann–Raether configuration, where TIR creates an evanescent wave that couples the free electrons of the metal surface. High numerical aperture objective lenses have been explored as a variant of prism-coupling to excite surface plasmon polaritons. Waveguide coupling is also used to create surface plasmons.

=== Prism coupling ===
Kretschmann–Raether configuration is used to achieve resonance between light and free electrons of the metal surface. In this configuration a prism with high refractive index is interfaced with a metal film. Light from a source propagates through the prism is made incident on the metal film. As a consequence of the TIR, some leaked through metal film, forming evanescent wave in the dielectric medium as in Figure 6. The evanescent wave penetrates a characteristic distance into the less optically dense medium where it is attenuated.

Figure 6 shows the Kretschmann–Raether configuration, where a prism with refractive index of η_{1} is coupled to a dielectric surface with a refractive index η_{2}, the incidence angle of the light is θ.

The interaction between the light and the surface polaritons in the TIR can be explained by using the Fresnel multilayer reflection; the amplitude reflection coefficient (r_{pmd}) is expressed as follows in Equation 5.

$r_{pmd} = \frac{r_{pm} + r_{md} e^{2ik_{m\times q}}}{1 + r_{pm} r_{md} e^{2ik_{m\times q}}}$	Eq. 5

The power reflection coefficient R is defined as follows:

$R= \| r_{pmd} \|^2$	Eq. 6

In Figure 7, a schematic representation of the Otto prism coupling prism is shown. In the Figure 7, the air gap was shown a little thick just to explain the schematic although in reality, the air gap is so thin between prism and metal layer.

=== Waveguide coupling ===
The electromagnetic waves are conducted through an optical waveguide. When light enters to the region with a thin metal layer, it evanescently penetrates through the metal layer exciting a Surface Plasmon Wave (SPW). In waveguide coupling configuration, the waveguide is created when the refraction index of the grating is greater than that of substrate. Incident radiation propagates along the waveguide layer with high refractive index. In Figure 8, electromagnetic waves are guided through a wave-guiding layer, once the optical waves reached the interface wave-guiding layer metal an evanescent wave is created. The evanescent wave excites the surface plasmon at the metal-dielectric interface.

=== Grating coupling ===
Due to the periodic grating, the phase matching between the incident light and the guide mode is easy to obtain. According to Equation 7, the propagation vector (Kz) in the z direction can be tuned by changing the periodicity Λ. The grating vector can be modified, and the angle of resonant excitation can be controlled. In Figure 9, q is the diffraction order it can have values of any integer (positive, negative or zero).

$K_z = q \{2\pi/\Lambda\}$	Eq. 7

=== Resonance measurement methods ===
The propagation constant of a monochromatic beam of light parallel to the surface is defined by Equation 8.

$k_x = \frac{2\pi} \lambda n_p \sin \theta$	Eq. 8

where θ is the angle of incidence, k_{sp} is the propagation constant of the surface plasmon, and n_{(p)} is the refractive index of the prism. When the wave vector of the SPW, k_{sp} matches the wave vector of the incident light $k_x$, SPW is expressed as:

$k_{sp} = \frac{2\pi} \lambda \sqrt{\frac{\varepsilon_m + \varepsilon_d}{\varepsilon_m + \varepsilon_d}}$	Eq. 9

Here εd and εm represent the dielectric constant of dielectrics and the metal while the wavelength of the incident light corresponds to λ. kx and ksp can be represented as:

$\theta_{sp} = \sin^{-1} \sqrt{\frac{\varepsilon_m \varepsilon_d}{\varepsilon_p(\varepsilon_m + \varepsilon_d)}}$	Eq. 10

The surface plasmons are evanescent waves that have their maximum intensity at the interface and decay exponentially away from the phase boundary to a penetration depth. The propagation of the surface plasmons is intensely affected by a thin film coating on the conducting layer. The resonance angle θ shifts, when the metal surface is coated with a dielectric material, due to the change of the propagation vector k of the surface plasmon. This sensitivity is due to the shallow penetration depth of the evanescent wave. Materials with a high amount of free electrons are used. Metal films of roughly 50 nm made of copper, titanium, chromium and gold are used. However, Au is the most common metal used in SPR as well as in SPRM.

Scanning angle SPR is the most widely used method for detecting biomolecular interactions. It measures the reflectance percentage (%R) from a prism/metal film assembly as a function of the incident angle at a fixed excitation wavelength. When the angle of incidence matches the propagation constant of the interface, this mode is excited at expenditure of the reflected light. As a consequence, the reflectivity value at the resonance angle is dumped.

The propagation constant of the polaritons can be modified by varying the dielectric material. This modification causes resonance angle shifting as in the example shown in Figure 10, from θ_{1} to θ_{2} due to the change on the surface plasmon propagation constant.

The resonance angle can be found by using Equation 11.

$\theta_\text{SPR} = \sin^{-1} \left( \frac 1 {n_1} \sqrt{\frac{n_2^2 n_g^2}{n_2^2 + n_g^2}} \, \right)$	Eq. 11

where n_{1} is n_{2} and n_{g} are the refractive index of medium 1, 2 and the metal layer, respectively.

Using TIR two-dimensional imaging is possible to achieve spatial differences in %R at a fixed angle θ. A beam of monochromatic light is used to irradiate the sample at a fixed incident angle. The SPR image is created from the reflected light detected by a CCD camera. The minimum value of %R at the resonance angle provides SPRM.

Huang and collaborators developed a microscope with an objective with high numerical aperture (NA), which improve the lateral resolution at expense of the longitudinal resolution.

=== Lateral resolution ===
The resolution of a conventional light microscopy is limited by the light diffraction limit. In SPRM, the excited surface plasmons adopt a horizontal configuration from the incident beam light. The polaritons will travel along the metal-dielectric interface, for a determined period, until they decay back into photons. Therefore, the resolution achieved by SPRM is determined by the propagation length ksp of the surface plasmons parallel to the incident plane. The separation between two areas should be approximately the magnitude of ksp in order to be resolved. Berger, Kooyman and Greve showed that the lateral resolution can be tuned by changing the excitation wavelength, the better resolution is achieved when the excitation energy increases. Equations 4 and 12 defines the magnitude of the wave vector of the surface plasmons.

$k_{sp} = \frac{2\pi} \lambda \sqrt{\frac{n_2^2 n_g^2}{n_b^2 + b_g^2}}$	Eq. 12

where n_{2} is the refractive index of medium 2, n_{g} is the refractive index of the metal film, and λ is the excitation wavelength.

== Instrumentation ==
The surface plasmon resonance microscopy is based on surface plasmon resonance and recording desired images of the structures present on the substrate using an instrument equipped with a CCD camera. In the past decade, SPR sensing has been demonstrated to be an exceedingly powerful technique and used quite extensively in the research and development of materials, biochemistry and pharmaceutical sciences.

The SPRM instrument works with the combination of the following main components: source light (typically He-Ne laser), that further travels through a prism that is attached to a glass side, coated with a thin metal film (typically gold or silver), where the light beam reflects at the gold/solution interface at an angle greater than the critical angle. The reflected light from the interface surface area is recorded by a CCD detector, and an image is recorded. Although the above-mentioned components are some important for SPRM, additional accessories such as polarizers, filters, beam expanders, focusing lenses, rotating stage, etc., similar to several imaging methods are installed and used in the instrumentation for an effective microscopic technique as demanded by the application. Figure 12 shows a typical SPRM. Depending on the applications, and to optimize the imaging technique, the researchers modify this basic instrumentation with some design changes that even include altering the source beam. One of such design changes that resulted in a different SPRM is an objective-type as shown in Figure 11 with some modification in the optical configuration.

The SPRi systems are currently manufactured by well known biomedical instrumentation manufacturers such as GE Life Sciences, HORIBA, Biosensing USA, etc. The cost of SPRi's ranger from, USD 100k-250k, although simple demonstration prototypes can be made for USD2000.

== Sample preparation ==
To perform measurements for SPRM, the sample preparation is a critical step. There are two factors that can be affected by the immobilization step: one is the reliability and reproducibility of the acquire data. It is important to ensure stability to the recognition element; such as antibodies, proteins, enzymes, under the experiment conditions. Moreover, the stability of the immobilized specimens will affect the sensitivity, and/or the limit of detection (LOD).

One of the most popular immobilization methods used is Self-Assembled Monolayer (SAM) on gold surface. Jenkins and collaborators 2001, used mercaptoethanol patches surrounded by SAM composed of octadecanethiol (ODT) to study the adsorption of egg-phosphatidylcholine on the ODT SAM. A pattern of ODT-mercaptoethanol was made onto a 50 nm gold film. The gold film was obtained through thermal evaporation on a LaSFN 9 glass. The lipid vesicles were deposited on the ODT SAM through adsorption, giving a final multilayer thickness greater than 80 Å.

11-Mercaptoundecanoic acid-Self assembled monolayer (MUA-SAM) were formed on Gold coated BK7 slides. A PDMS plate was masked on the MUA-SAM chip. Clenbuterol (CLEN) was attached to BSA molecules through amide bond, between the carboxylic group of BSA and the amine group of CLEN molecules. In order to immobilize BSA on the gold surface, the spots created through PDMS making were functionalized with sulfo-NHS and EDC, subsequently 1% BSA solution was poured in the spots and incubated for 1 hour. Non-immobilized BSA was rinsed out with PBS and CLEN solution was poured on the spots, unimmobilized CLEN was removed through PBS rinse.

An alkanethiol-SAM was prepared in order to simultaneously measure the concentration of horseradish peroxidase (Px), Human Immunoglobulin E (IgE), Human choriogonadotropin (hCG) and Human immunoglobulin G (IgG), through SPR. The alkanethiols made of carbon chains composed by 11 and 16 carbons were self-assembled on the sensor chip. The antibodies were attached to the C16 alkanethiol, which had a terminal carboxylic group.

The micro patterned electrode was fabricated by gold deposition on microscope slides. PDMS stamping was used to produce an array of hydrophilic/hydrophobic surface; ODT treatment followed by immersion in 2-mercaptoethanol solutions rendered a functionalized surface for lipid membranes deposition. The patterned electrode was characterized through SPRM. In the Figure 14 B, the SPRM image reveals the size of the pockets, which was 100 um x 100 um, and they were 200 um apart. As is seen in the image the remarkable contrast of the image is due to the high sensitivity of the technique.

== Applications ==
SPRM is a useful technique for measuring concentration of biomolecules in the solution, detection of binding molecules and real time monitoring of molecular interactions. It can be used as biosensor for surface interactions of biological molecules: antigen-antibody binding, mapping and sorption kinetics. For example, one of the possible reason of Type 1 diabetes of children is the high-level presence of Cow's milk antibodies IgG, IgA, IgM (mainly due to IgA) in their serum. Cow's milk antibodies can be detected in the milk and serum sample using SPRM. SPRM is also advantageous to detect the site-specific attachment of lymphocyte B or T on antibody array. This technique is convenient to study the label free and real time interactions of cells on the surface. So SPRM can be served as diagnostic tool for cell surface adhesion kinetics. Besides its merits, there are limitations of SPRM though. It's not applicable for detecting low molecular weight molecules. Although it's label free but will need to have crystal clean experimental conditions. Sensitivity of SPRM can be improved with coupling of MALDI-MS. There are a number of applications of SPRM from which some of them are being described here.

=== Membrane proteins ===
Membrane proteins are responsible for the regulation of cellular responses to extracellular signals. It has been the challenging thing to investigate the involvement of membrane proteins in disease biomarkers and therapeutic targets and its binding kinetics with their ligands. Traditional approaches could not reflect clear structures and functions of membrane proteins. In order to understand the structural details of membrane proteins, there is a need of alternate analytical tool, which can provide three-dimensional and sequential resolutions that can monitor membrane proteins. Atomic force microscopy (AFM) is an excellent method for obtaining high spatial resolution images of membrane proteins, but it might not be helpful to investigate its binding kinetics. Fluorescence-based microscopy (FLM) can be used to study the interactions of membrane proteins in individual cells but it requires development of proper labels and needs tactics for different target proteins. Furthermore, host protein may be affected by the labeling.

Binding kinetics of MP's in the single living cells can be studied via label free imaging method based on SPR Microscopy without extracting the proteins from the cell membranes, which help scientists to work with the actual conformations of the membrane proteins. Furthermore, distribution and local binding activities of membrane proteins in each cell can be mapped and calculated. SPR microscopy (SPRM) makes possible to simultaneously optical and fluorescence imaging of the same sample, which prove to get the advantages of both label-based and label-free detection methods in the single setup.

=== Detection of DNA hybridization ===
SPR imaging is used to study the multiple adsorption interactions in an array format under same experimental conditions. Nelson and his coworkers introduced a multistep procedure to create DNA arrays on gold surfaces for use with SPR imaging. Affinity interactions can be studied for a variety of target molecules e.g. proteins and nucleic acids. Mismatching of bases in the DNA sequence leads to the number of lethal diseases like lynch syndrome which has high risk of colon cancer.

SPR imaging is useful to monitor adsorption of molecules on the gold surface which is possible because of the change in the reflectivity from the surface. First G-G mismatch pair is stabilized by attaching it with the ligand, naphthyridine dimer, through hydrogen bonding which make the hairpin structures in double stranded DNA on gold surface. Binding of Dimer with DNA enhances the free energy of hybridization, which causes change in index of refraction.

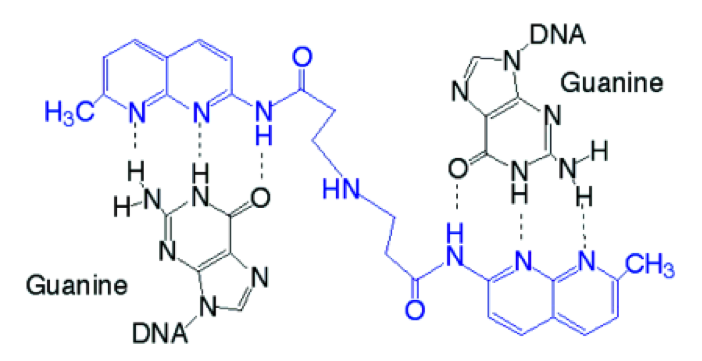
Figure 15. Structure of the G–G mismatch stabilizing the naphthyridine dimer (blue) is shown hydrogen bonding to two guanine bases (black).

DNA array is fabricated to test the G–G mismatch stabilizing properties of the naphthyridine dimer. Each of the four immobilized sequences in the array differed by one base. The position of this base is indicated by an X in sequence 1 as shown in Figure 16. The SPR difference image is only detected for the sequence having cytosine (C) base at the X position in sequence 1, the complementary sequence to sequence 2. However, the SPR difference image corresponding to the addition of sequence 2 in the presence of the naphthyridine dimer shows that, in addition to its complement, sequence 2 also hybridizes to the sequence that forms a G–G mismatch. These results demonstrate that SPR imaging is a promising tool for monitoring single base mismatches and screen out the hybridized molecules.

=== Antibody binding to protein arrays ===
SPR imaging can be used to study the binding of antibodies to protein array. Amine functionalities on the gold surface with proteins array, is used to study binding of antibodies. Immobilization of the protein was done by flowing protein solutions through the PDMS micro channels. Then PDMS was removed from the surface and solutions of antibody were flowed over the array. Three-component protein array containing the proteins human fibrinogen, ovalbumin, and bovine IgG is shown in Figure 17, SPR images obtained by Kariuki and co-workers. This contrast in the array is due to difference of refractive index which is outcome of local binding of antibodies. These images show that there is a high degree of antibody binding specificity and a small degree of non-specific adsorption of the antibody to the array background, which can be improved to modify the array background. Based on these results, SPR imaging technique can be opted as diagnostic tool for studying the antibody interactions to protein arrays.

=== Coupled with mass spectrometry ===
Discovery and validation of protein biomarkers are crucial for diseases diagnosis. Coupling of SPRM with MALDI-mass spectrometer (SUPRA-MS) enables the multiplex quantification of binding and molecular characterization on the basis of different masses. SUPRA-MS is used to detect, identify and characterize the potential breast cancer biomarker, LAG3 protein, introduced in the human plasma. Glass slides were taken to prepare gold chips via coating with thin layers of chromium and gold by sputtering process. Gold surface was functionalized using solution of 11-Mercapto-1-undecanol (11-MUOH) and 16-mercapto-1-hexadecanoic acid (16-MHA). This self-assembled monolayer was activated with sulfo-NHS and EDC. Pattern of sixteen droplets was deposited on the macroarray. Immunoglobin G antibodies were spotted against Lymphocyte activation gene 3 (α-LAG3) and rat serum albumin (α-RSA). After placing biochip in the SPRi and running buffer solution in the flow cell, α-LAG3 was injected. Special image station was used on the proteins that are attached. This station can also be placed on the MALDI. Before placing on the MALDI, captured proteins were reduced, digested and loaded with matrix in order to avoid contamination.

Antigen density is directly proportional to change in reflectivity ΔR because evanescent wave penetration depth Lzc is larger than thickness of immobilized antigen layer.

Antigen density${}= \Gamma \frac{pg}{mm^2} = \frac{\Delta R \times L_{zc}}{S_{PR} \times \frac{\partial n}{\partial c}}$	Eq. 13

where $\frac{\partial n}{\partial c}$ is the index increment of the molecule and $S_{PR}$ is the sensitivity prism, reflectivity.

Clean mass spectrum was obtained for LAG3 protein due to good tryptic digestion and homogeneity of the matrix (α-cyano-4-hydroxycinnamic acid). Relatively high intensity m/z peak of LAG3 protein was found at 1,422.70amu with average mascot score of 87.9 ± 2.4. Validation of MS results was further confirmed by MS-MS analysis. These results are similar to classical analytical method in-gel digestion.

Greater S/N > 10, 100% reliability and detection at femtomole level on chip proves the credibility of this coupling technique. One can find protein-protein interaction and on-chip peptide distribution with high spatial resolution using subjected technique.

=== DNA aptamers ===
Aptamers are particular DNA ligands that target biomolecules such as proteins. SPR imaging platform would be a good choice to characterize aptamer -protein interactions. To study the aptamer-protein interaction, first oligonucleotides are grafted through formation of thiol Self Assembling Monolayer (SAM) on gold substrate using piezoelectric dispensing system. Thiol groups are introduced on DNA nucleotides by N-hydroxysuccinimide (NHS). Target oligonucleotides having a primary amine group at their 59th end are conjugated to HS-C (11)-NHS in phosphate buffer solution at pH 8.0 for one hour at room temperature. Aptamer grafting biosensor is placed on SPRM after rinsing. Then Thrombin is co-injected with excess of cytochrome C for signal specificity. Concentration of free thrombin is determined by calibration curve obtained by plotting initial slope of the signal at the beginning of injection against concentration. The interaction of thrombin and the aptamer can be monitored on microarray in real-time during injections of thrombin at different concentrations. Solution phase dissociation constant KDsol (3.16 ± 1.16 nM) is calculated from the measured concentrations of free thrombin.

$K_D^\text{sol} = \frac{[\text{THR}][\text{APT}]}{\text{THR} \cdots \text{APT}}$	Eq. 14

[THR---APT] = cTHR – [THR], the equilibrium concentration of thrombin attached to aptamers in solution and [APT] = cAPT – [THR---APT], the concentration of free aptamers in solution.

Surface phase dissociation constant KDsurf (3.84 ± 0.68) is obtained by fitting Langmuir adsorption isotherm on equilibrium signals. Both dissociation constants are significantly different because KDsurf is dependent on the surface grafting density as shown in Figure 19. This dependence extrapolates linearly at low sigma to solution-phase affinity.

The difference in SPRi image can gives us information regarding the presence of binding and specificity but not suitable for quantification of free protein in case of multiple affinity sites. The real time monitoring of the interaction is possible by using SPRM to study the kinetics and the affinity of the interactions.

=== Detection of polymer interaction ===
Despite using surface plasmon resonance imaging (SPRi) in biology to characterize interactions between two biological molecules, it is also useful to monitor the interactions between two polymers. In this approach, one polymer, called as host protein HP, is immobilized on the surface of a biochip and the other polymer designated as guest polymer GP is inserted on the SPRi-Biochip to study the interactions. For example, a host protein of amine-functionalized poly(β-cyclodextrin) and guest protein of PEG (ada)4.

SPRi biochip was used for immobilization of HP of different concentrations. An array of HP active sites was produced on the chip. The attachment of HP was done through its amino groups to N-hydroxy succinimide functionalities on the gold surface. First SPRi system was filled running buffer solution followed by placing of SPRi –biochip into the analysis chamber. Two solutions of different concentrations of GP was 1g/L and 0.1 g/L were injected in the flow cell. The association and the dissociation of both polymers can be monitored in real-time on the basis of change in reflectivity and images from SPRM can be differentiated on the basis of white spots (association phase) and black spots (dissociation phase). PEG without adamantyl groups didn't show adsorption on β-cyclodextrin cavities. On the other hand, there wasn't any adsorption of GP without HP on the chip. Change in SPRi response on the reaction sites is provided by the capturing of kinetic curves and real time images from the CCD camera. Local changes in light reflectivity are directly related to quantity of target molecules on each point. Variation at the surface of the chip provide comprehensive knowledge on molecular binding and kinetic processes.

=== Bio-mineralization ===
One of the important class of biomaterials is polymer hydroxyapatite that is remarkably useful in the field of bone regeneration because of its resemblance with natural bone material. The advantage of hydroxyapatite, (Ca10(PO4)6(OH)2, is being started to form inside the bone tissue through mineralization which also advocate the enhancement of osteointegration. Biomineralization is also called calcification, in which calcium cations come from cells and physiological fluids while phosphate anions are produced from hydrolysis of phosphoesters and phosphoproteins as well as from the body fluids. This phenomenon is also tested in vitro studies.

For in vitro studies, Polyamidoamine (PAMAM) dendrimers with amino- and carboxylic-acid external reactive shells are considered as sensing phase. These dendrimers are required to immobilized on the gold surface and inactive to gold surface. Hence, thiols groups have to be introduced at the terminals of dendrimers so that dendrimers can be attached on the gold surface. Carboxylic groups are functionalized by N,N-(3-dimethylaminopropyl)-N'-ethyl-carbodiimide hydrochloride (EDC) and N-hydroxysuccinimide (NHS) solutions in phosphate buffer. Functional groups (amide, amino and carboxyl) act as ionic pumps capturing calcium ions from the test fluids; then calcium cations bind with phosphate anions to generate calcium-phosphate mineral nuclei on the dendrimer surface.

SPRM is expected to be sensitive enough to provide important quantitative information on mineralization's occurrence and kinetics. This detection of the mineralization is based on the specific mass change induced by the mineral nuclei formation and growth. Nucleation and progress in mineralization can be monitored by SPRM as shown in Figure 20. PAMAM-containing sensors are fixed on the SPRi analysis platform and then exposed to experimental fluids in the flow cell as shown in Figure 21. SPRM is not adapted to sense the origin and nature of mass change but it detects the modification of refractive index due to mineral precipitation.
