= Conformation–activity relationship =

How a biomolecule's structure influences biological activity

In biochemistry, the conformation–activity relationship is the relationship between the biological activity and the chemical structure or conformational changes of a biomolecule. This terminology emphasizes the importance of dynamic conformational changes for the biological function, rather than the importance of static three-dimensional structure used in the analysis of structure–activity relationships.

The conformational changes usually take place during intermolecular association, such as protein–protein interaction or protein–ligand binding. A binding partner changes the conformation of a biomolecule (e.g. a protein) to enable or disable its biochemical activity.

Methods for analysis of conformation activity relationship vary from in silico or using experimental methods such as X-ray crystallography and NMR where the conformation before and after activity can be compared statically or using dynamic methods such as multi-parametric surface plasmon resonance, dual-polarisation interferometry or circular dichroism where the kinetics as well as degree of conformational change can be quantified.

== Experimental techniques ==
=== Static ===
Static experimental techniques include X-ray crystallography and NMR.

=== Dynamic ===
Dynamic experimental techniques include multi-parametric surface plasmon resonance, dual-polarization interferometry, and circular dichroism.
