= Surface plasmon resonance =

Physical phenomenon of electron resonance

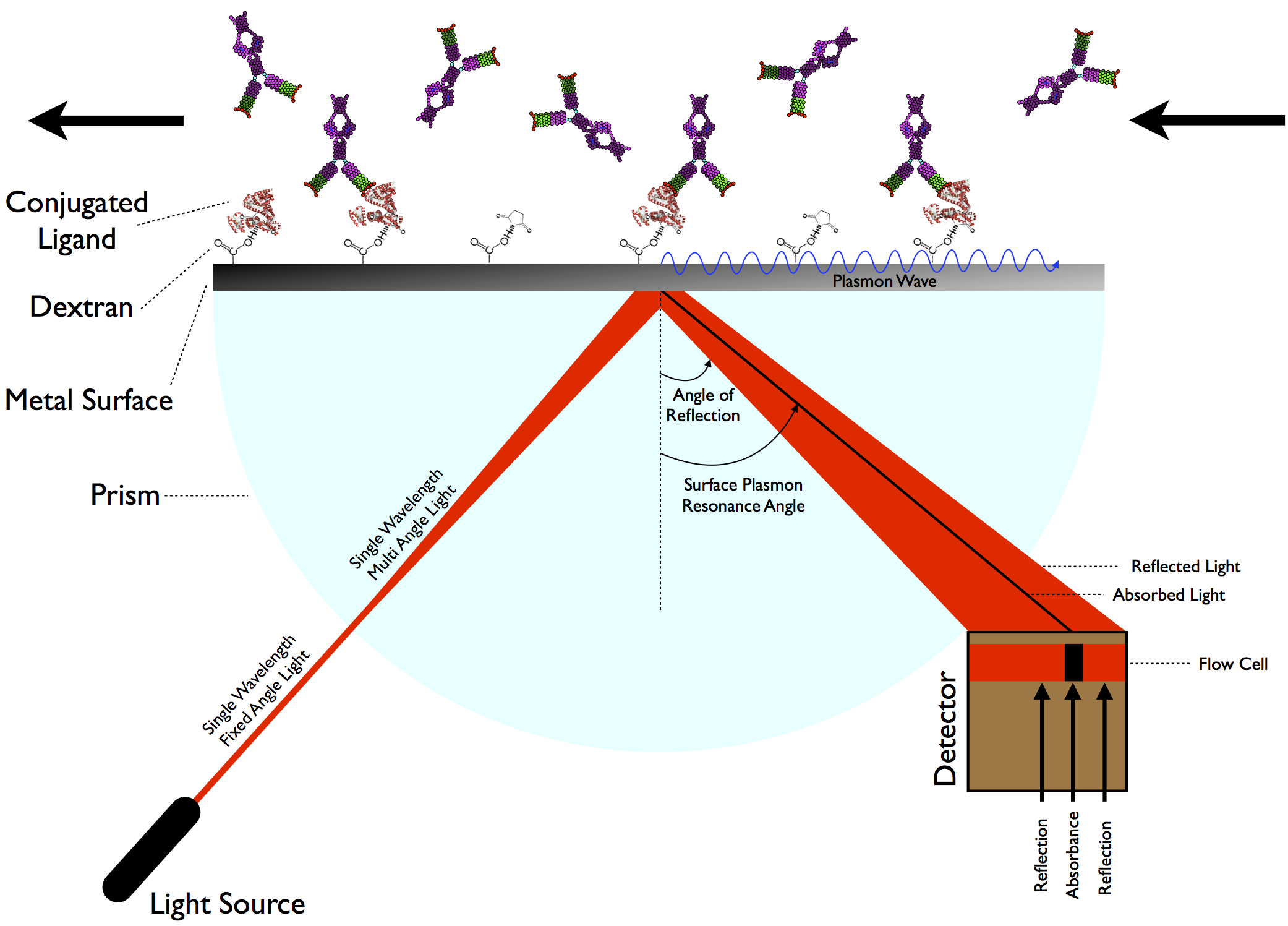
Surface plasmon resonance (SPR)

Surface plasmon resonance (SPR) is a phenomenon that occurs where electrons in a thin metal sheet become excited by light that is directed to the sheet with a particular angle of incidence, and then travel parallel to the sheet. Assuming a constant light source wavelength and that the metal sheet is thin, the angle of incidence that triggers SPR is related to the refractive index of the material; even a small change in the refractive index will cause SPR to not be observed. This makes SPR a possible technique for detecting particular substances (analytes) and SPR biosensors have been developed to detect various important biomarkers.

== Explanation ==
The surface plasmon polariton is a non-radiative electromagnetic surface wave that propagates in a direction parallel to the negative permittivity/dielectric material interface. Since the wave is on the boundary of the conductor and the external medium (air, water or vacuum for example), these oscillations are very sensitive to any change of this boundary, such as the adsorption of molecules to the conducting surface.

To describe the existence and properties of surface plasmon polaritons, one can choose from various models (quantum theory, Drude model, etc.). The simplest way to approach the problem is to treat each material as a homogeneous continuum, described by a frequency-dependent relative permittivity between the external medium and the surface. This quantity, hereafter referred to as the materials' "dielectric function", is the complex permittivity. In order for the terms that describe the electronic surface plasmon to exist, the real part of the dielectric constant of the conductor must be negative and its magnitude must be greater than that of the dielectric. This condition is met in the infrared-visible wavelength region for air/metal and water/metal interfaces (where the real dielectric constant of a metal is negative and that of air or water is positive).

LSPRs (localized surface plasmon resonances) are collective electron charge oscillations in metallic nanoparticles that are excited by light. They exhibit enhanced near-field amplitude at the resonance wavelength. This field is highly localized at the nanoparticle and decays rapidly away from the nanoparticle/dielectric interface into the dielectric background, though far-field scattering by the particle is also enhanced by the resonance. Light intensity enhancement is a very important aspect of LSPRs and localization means the LSPR has very high spatial resolution (subwavelength), limited only by the size of nanoparticles. Because of the enhanced field amplitude, effects that depend on the amplitude such as magneto-optical effect are also enhanced by LSPRs.

== Implementations ==
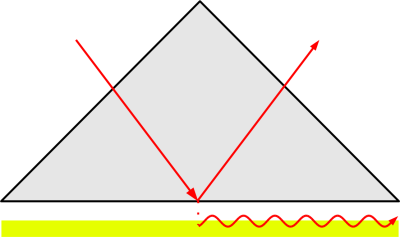
Otto configuration

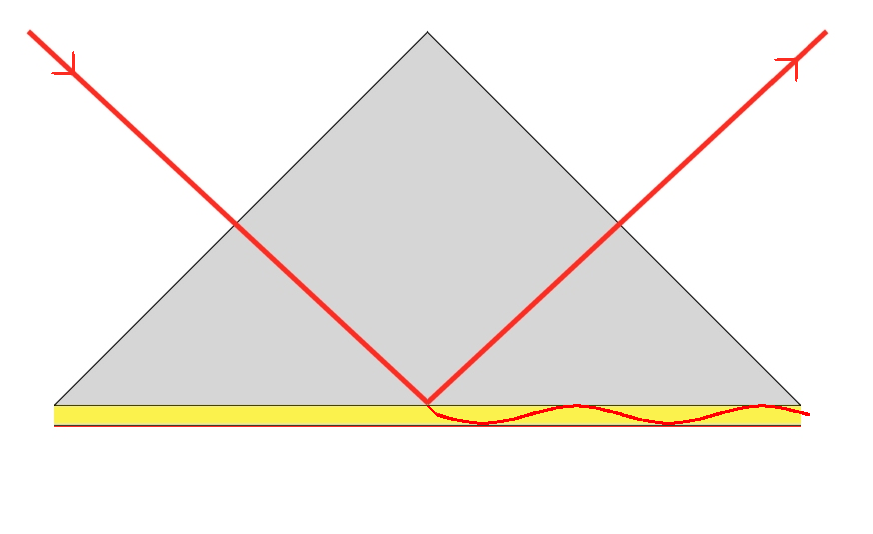
Kretschmann configuration

In order to excite surface plasmon polaritons in a resonant manner, one can use electron bombardment or incident light beam (visible and infrared are typical). The incoming beam has to match its momentum to that of the plasmon. In the case of p-polarized light (polarization occurs parallel to the plane of incidence), this is possible by passing the light through a block of glass to increase the wavenumber (and the momentum), and achieve the resonance at a given wavelength and angle. S-polarized light (polarization occurs perpendicular to the plane of incidence) cannot excite electronic surface plasmons. Electronic and magnetic surface plasmons obey the following dispersion relation:

$$k(\omega) = \frac{\omega}{c} \sqrt{\frac{\varepsilon_1 \varepsilon_2 \mu_1 \mu_2}{\varepsilon_1 \mu_1 + \varepsilon_2 \mu_2}}$$

where k($\omega$) is the wave vector, $\varepsilon$ is the relative permittivity, and $\mu$ is the relative permeability of the material (1: the glass block, 2: the metal film), while $\omega$ is angular frequency and ${c}$ is the speed of light in vacuum.

Typical metals that support surface plasmons are silver and gold, but metals such as copper, titanium or chromium have also been used.

When using light to excite SP waves, there are two configurations which are well known. In the Otto configuration, the light illuminates the wall of a glass block, typically a prism, and is totally internally reflected. A thin metal film (for example gold) is positioned close enough to the prism wall so that an evanescent wave can interact with the plasma waves on the surface and hence excite the plasmons.

In the Kretschmann configuration (also known as Kretschmann–Raether configuration), the metal film is evaporated onto the glass block. The light again illuminates the glass block, and an evanescent wave penetrates through the metal film. The plasmons are excited at the outer side of the film. This configuration is used in most practical applications.

=== SPR emission ===
When the surface plasmon wave interacts with a local particle or irregularity, such as a rough surface, part of the energy can be re-emitted as light. This emitted light can be detected behind the metal film from various directions.

=== Analytical implementations ===
Surface plasmon resonance can be implemented in analytical instrumentation. SPR instruments consist of a light source, an input scheme, a prism with analyte interface, a detector, and computer. Any quantitative derivation relies on modelling the surface based on the boundary conditions of the Maxwell's equations, for plane films using the Fresnel equations.

=== Detectors ===
The detectors used in surface plasmon resonance convert the photons of light reflected off the metallic film into an electrical signal. A position sensing detector (PSD) or charged-coupled device (CCD) may be used to operate as detectors.

== Applications ==
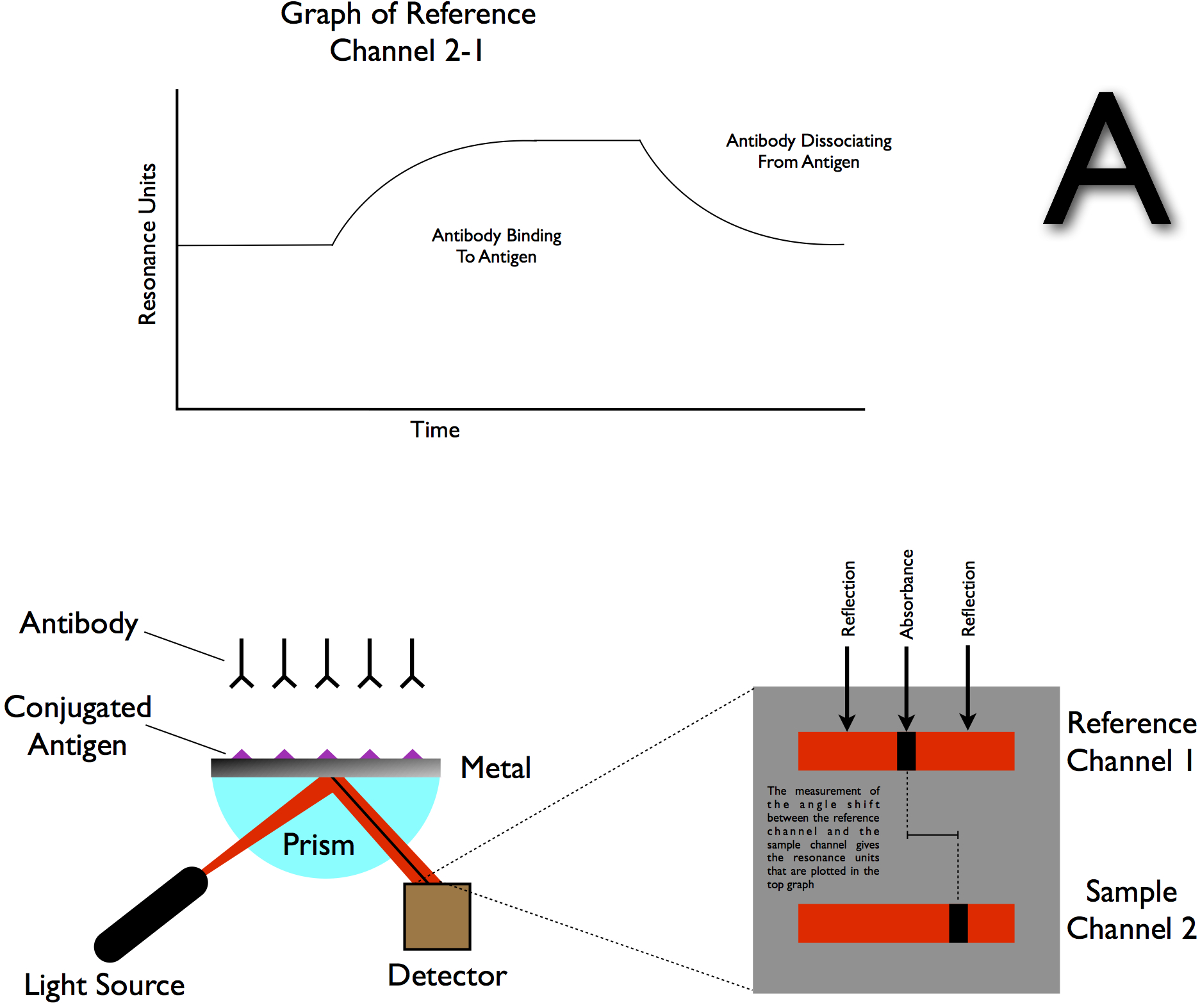
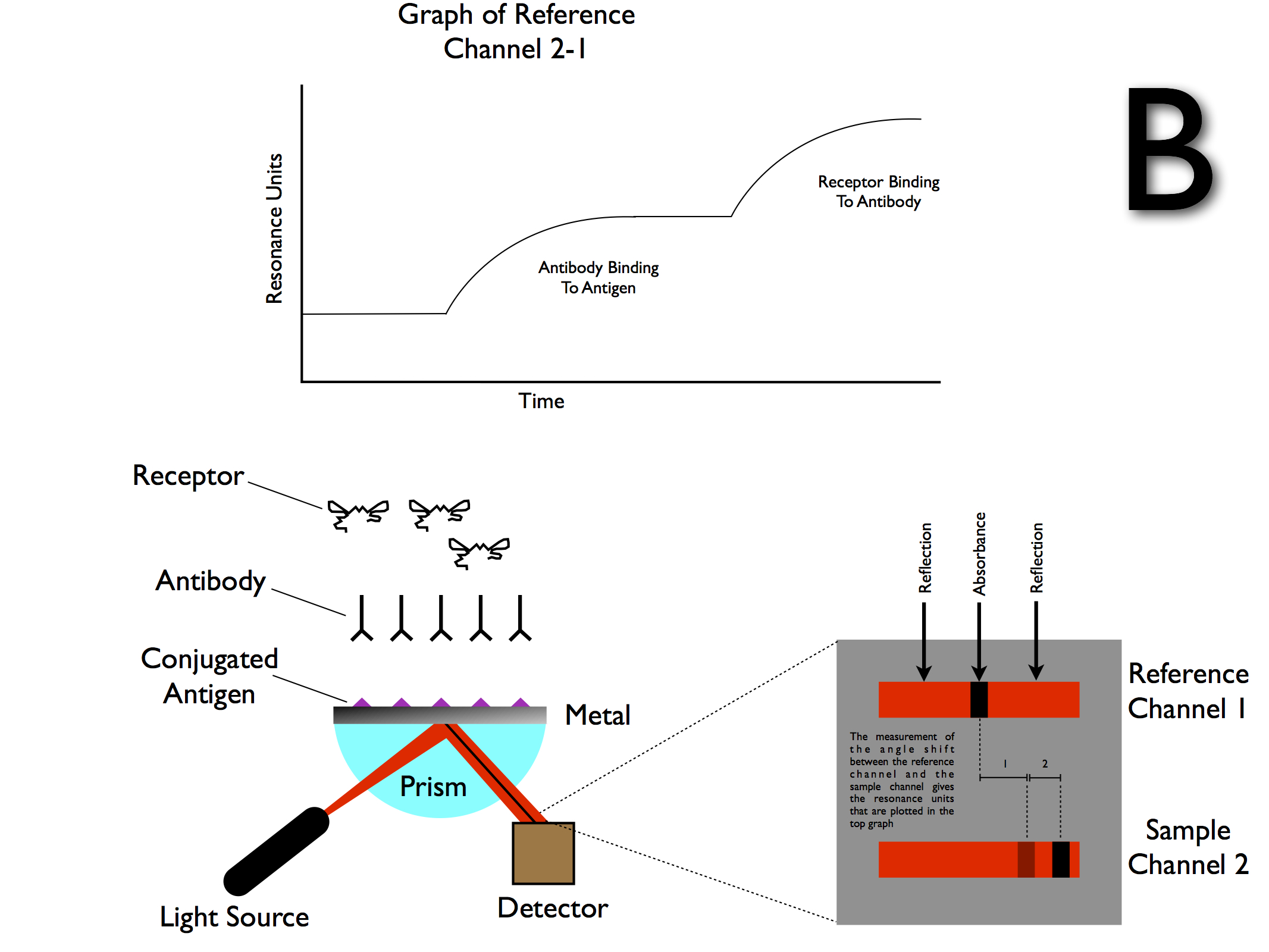
Scheme for a sensor that uses surface plasmon resonance

Surface plasmons have been used to enhance the surface sensitivity of several spectroscopic measurements including fluorescence, Raman scattering, and second-harmonic generation. In their simplest form, SPR reflectivity measurements can be used to detect molecular adsorption, such as polymers, DNA or proteins, etc. Technically, it is common to measure the angle of minimum reflection (angle of maximum absorption). This angle changes in the order of 0.1° during thin (about nm thickness) film adsorption. (See also the Examples.) In other cases the changes in the absorption wavelength is followed. The mechanism of detection is based on the adsorbing molecules causing changes in the local index of refraction, changing the resonance conditions of the surface plasmon waves. The same principle is exploited in the recently developed competitive platform based on loss-less dielectric multilayers (DBR), supporting surface electromagnetic waves with sharper resonances (Bloch surface waves).

If the surface is patterned with different biopolymers, using adequate optics and imaging sensors (i.e. a camera), the technique can be extended to surface plasmon resonance imaging (SPRI). This method provides a high contrast of the images based on the adsorbed amount of molecules, somewhat similar to Brewster angle microscopy (this latter is most commonly used together with a Langmuir–Blodgett trough).

For nanoparticles, localized surface plasmon oscillations can give rise to the intense colors of suspensions or sols containing the nanoparticles. Nanoparticles or nanowires of noble metals exhibit strong absorption bands in the ultraviolet–visible light regime that are not present in the bulk metal. This extraordinary absorption increase has been exploited to increase light absorption in photovoltaic cells by depositing metal nanoparticles on the cell surface. The energy (color) of this absorption differs when the light is polarized along or perpendicular to the nanowire. Shifts in this resonance due to changes in the local index of refraction upon adsorption to the nanoparticles can also be used to detect biopolymers such as DNA or proteins. Related complementary techniques include plasmon waveguide resonance, QCM, extraordinary optical transmission, and dual-polarization interferometry.

=== SPR immunoassay ===
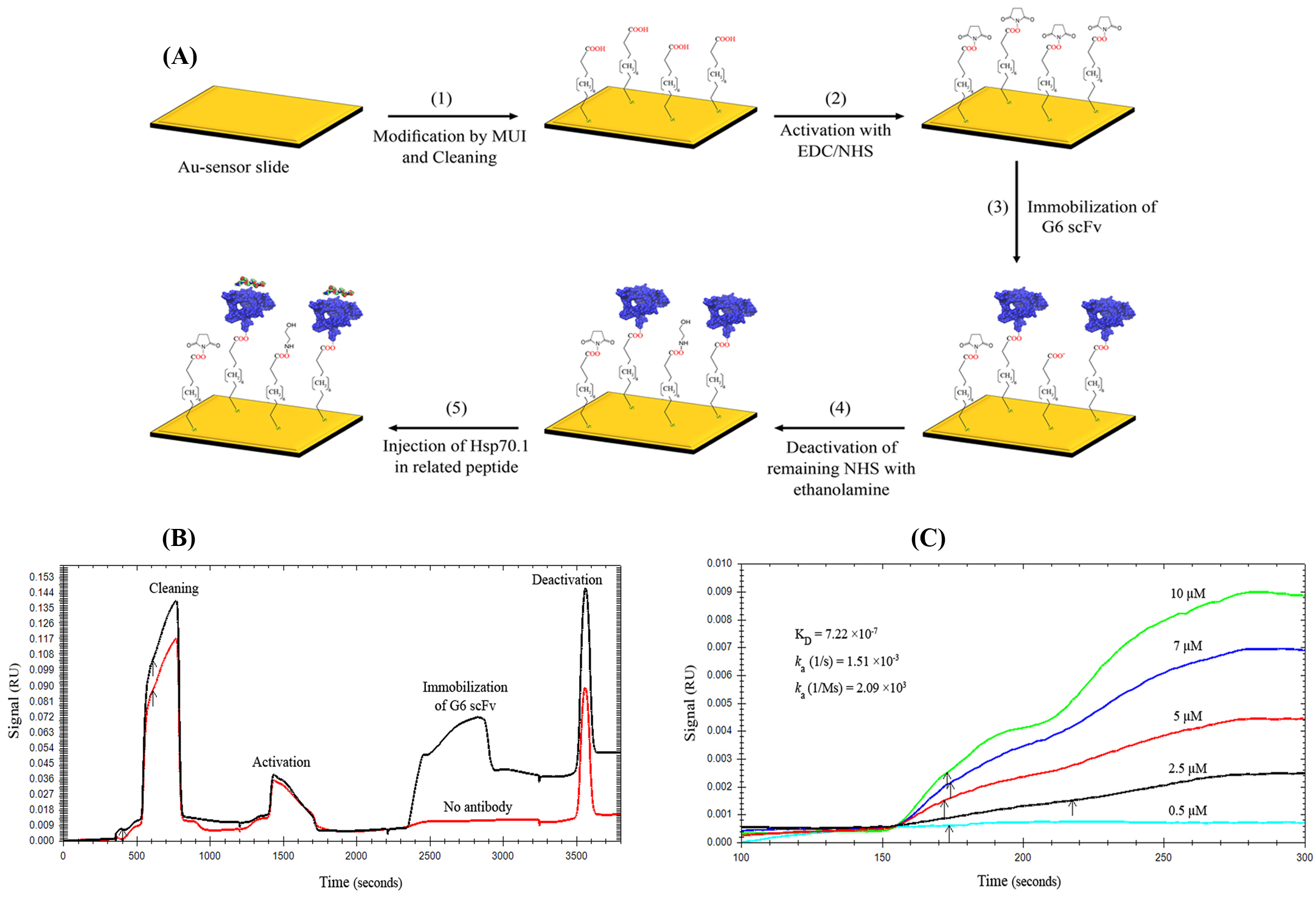
SPR analysis of the purified G6 scFv. (A) Illustrative schematic representing of G6 scFv immobilization on an MUA‐modified Ausensor. (B) SPR sensogram of the G6 scFv immobilization on an MUA‐modified Au‐sensor slide. (C) Sensogram of Hsp70 in related peptide. scFv: a single-chain variable fragment of an antibody

The first SPR immunoassay was proposed in 1983 by Liedberg, Nylander, and Lundström, then of the Linköping Institute of Technology (Sweden). They adsorbed human IgG onto a 600-Ångström silver film, and used the assay to detect anti-human IgG in water solution. Unlike many other immunoassays, such as ELISA, an SPR immunoassay is label free in that a label molecule is not required for detection of the analyte. Additionally, the measurements on SPR can be followed real-time allowing the monitoring of individual steps in sequential binding events particularly useful in the assessment of for instance sandwich complexes.

=== Explosive detection ===
Surface Plasmon Resonance (SPR) Immunosensors: Real-time, label-free optical biosensors that track antibody-antigen binding kinetics for trace explosives like TNT.

=== Material characterization ===
Multi-parametric surface plasmon resonance, a special configuration of SPR, can be used to characterize layers and stacks of layers. Besides binding kinetics, MP-SPR can also provide information on structural changes in terms of layer true thickness and refractive index. MP-SPR has been applied successfully in measurements of lipid targeting and rupture, CVD-deposited single monolayer of graphene (3.7Å) as well as micrometer thick polymers.

=== Data interpretation ===
The most common data interpretation is based on the Fresnel formulas, which treat the formed thin films as infinite, continuous dielectric layers. This interpretation may result in multiple possible refractive index and thickness values. Usually only one solution is within the reasonable data range. In multi-parametric surface plasmon resonance, two SPR curves are acquired by scanning a range of angles at two different wavelengths, which results in a unique solution for both thickness and refractive index.

Metal particle plasmons are usually modeled using the Mie scattering theory.

In many cases no detailed models are applied, but the sensors are calibrated for the specific application, and used with interpolation within the calibration curve.

=== Novel applications ===
Due to the versatility of SPR instrumentation, this technique pairs well with other approaches, leading to novel applications in various fields, such as biomedical and environmental studies.

When coupled with nanotechnology, SPR biosensors can use nanoparticles as carriers for therapeutic implants. For instance, in the treatment of Alzheimer's disease, nanoparticles can be used to deliver therapeutic molecules in targeted ways. In general, SPR biosensing is demonstrating advantages over other approaches in the biomedical field due to this technique being label-free, lower in costs, applicable in point-of-care settings, and capable of producing faster results for smaller research cohorts.

In the study of environmental pollutants, SPR instrumentation can be used as a replacement for former chromatography-based techniques. Current pollution research relies on chromatography to monitor increases in pollution in an ecosystem over time. When SPR instrumentation with a Kretschmann prism configuration was used in the detection of chlorophene, an emerging pollutant, it was demonstrated that SPR has similar precision and accuracy levels as chromatography techniques. Furthermore, SPR sensing surpasses chromatography techniques through its high-speed, straightforward analysis.

== Examples ==
=== Layer-by-layer self-assembly ===
SPR curves measured during the adsorption of a polyelectrolyte and then a clay mineral self-assembled film onto a thin (ca. 38 nanometers) gold sensor.

One of the first common applications of surface plasmon resonance spectroscopy was the measurement of the thickness (and refractive index) of adsorbed self-assembled nanofilms on gold substrates. The resonance curves shift to higher angles as the thickness of the adsorbed film increases. This example is a 'static SPR' measurement.

When higher speed observation is desired, one can select an angle right below the resonance point (the angle of minimum reflectance), and measure the reflectivity changes at that point. This is the so-called 'dynamic SPR' measurement. The interpretation of the data assumes that the structure of the film does not change significantly during the measurement.

=== Binding constant determination ===
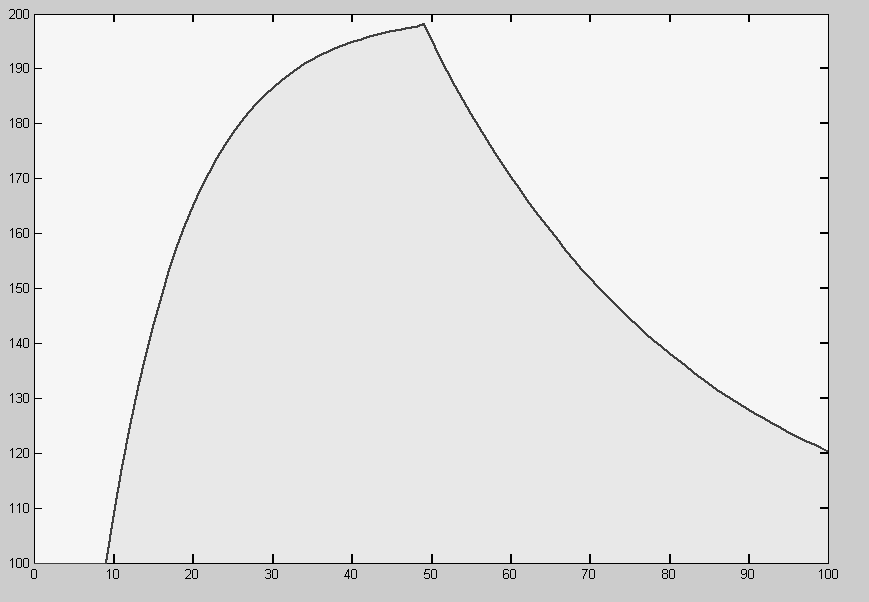
Association and dissociation signal

Example of output from Biacore

SPR can be used to study the real-time kinetics of molecular interactions. Determining the affinity between two ligands involves establishing the equilibrium dissociation constant, representing the equilibrium value for the product quotient. This constant can be determined using dynamic SPR parameters, calculated as the dissociation rate divided by the association rate.

$$K_{\rm D} = \frac{k_{\text{d}}}{k_{\text{a}}}$$

In this process, a ligand is immobilized on the dextran surface of the SPR crystal. Through a microflow system, a solution with the analyte is injected over the ligand-covered surface. The binding of the analyte to the ligand causes an increase in the SPR signal (expressed in response units, RU). Following the association time, a solution without the analyte (typically a buffer) is introduced into the microfluidics to initiate the dissociation of the bound complex between the ligand and analyte. As the analyte dissociates from the ligand, the SPR signal decreases. From these association ('on rate', k_{a}) and dissociation rates ('off rate', k_{d}), the equilibrium dissociation constant ('binding constant', K_{D}) can be calculated.

The detected SPR signal is a consequence of the electromagnetic 'coupling' of the incident light with the surface plasmon of the gold layer. This interaction is particularly sensitive to the characteristics of the layer at the gold–solution interface, which is usually just a few nanometers thick. When substances bind to the surface, it alters the way light is reflected, causing a change in the reflection angle, which can be measured as a signal in SPR experiments. One common application is measuring the kinetics of antibody-antigen interactions.

=== Thermodynamic analysis ===
As SPR biosensors facilitate measurements at different temperatures, thermodynamic analysis can be performed to obtain a better understanding of the studied interaction. By performing measurements at different temperatures, typically between 4 and 40 °C, it is possible to relate association and dissociation rate constants with activation energy and thereby obtain thermodynamic parameters including binding enthalpy, binding entropy, Gibbs free energy and heat capacity.

=== Pair-wise epitope mapping ===
As SPR allows real-time monitoring, individual steps in sequential binding events can be thoroughly assessed when investigating the suitability between antibodies in a sandwich configuration. Additionally, it allows the mapping of epitopes as antibodies of overlapping epitopes will be associated with an attenuated signal compared to those capable of interacting simultaneously.

== Innovations ==
=== Magnetic plasmon resonance ===
Recently, there has been an interest in magnetic surface plasmons. These require materials with large negative magnetic permeability, a property that has only recently been made available with the construction of metamaterials.

=== Graphene ===
Layering graphene on top of gold has been shown to improve SPR sensor performance. Its high electrical conductivity increases the sensitivity of detection. The large surface area of graphene also facilitates the immobilization of biomolecules while its low refractive index minimizes its interference. Enhancing SPR sensitivity by incorporating graphene with other materials expands the potential of SPR sensors, making them practical in a broader range of applications. For instance, the enhanced sensitivity of graphene can be used in conjunction with a silver SPR sensor, providing a cost-effective alternative for measuring glucose levels in urine.

Graphene has also been shown to improve the resistance of SPR sensors to high-temperature annealing up to 500 °C.

=== Fiber-optic SPR ===
Recent advancements in SPR technology have given rise to novel formats, increasing the scope and applicability of SPR sensing. Fiber optic SPR involves the integration of SPR sensors into the optical fibers, enabling the direct coupling of light with the surface plasmons as light is passed through the hollow SPR core, and the analyte is behind a thin metal sheet surrounding the hollow core. This format offers enhanced sensitivity and allows for the development of compact sensing devices, making it particularly valuable for applications requiring remote sensing in the field. It also offers an increased surface area for analytes to bind to the inner lining of the fiber optic.

=== Inverted Surface Plasmon Resonance (ISPR) features ===
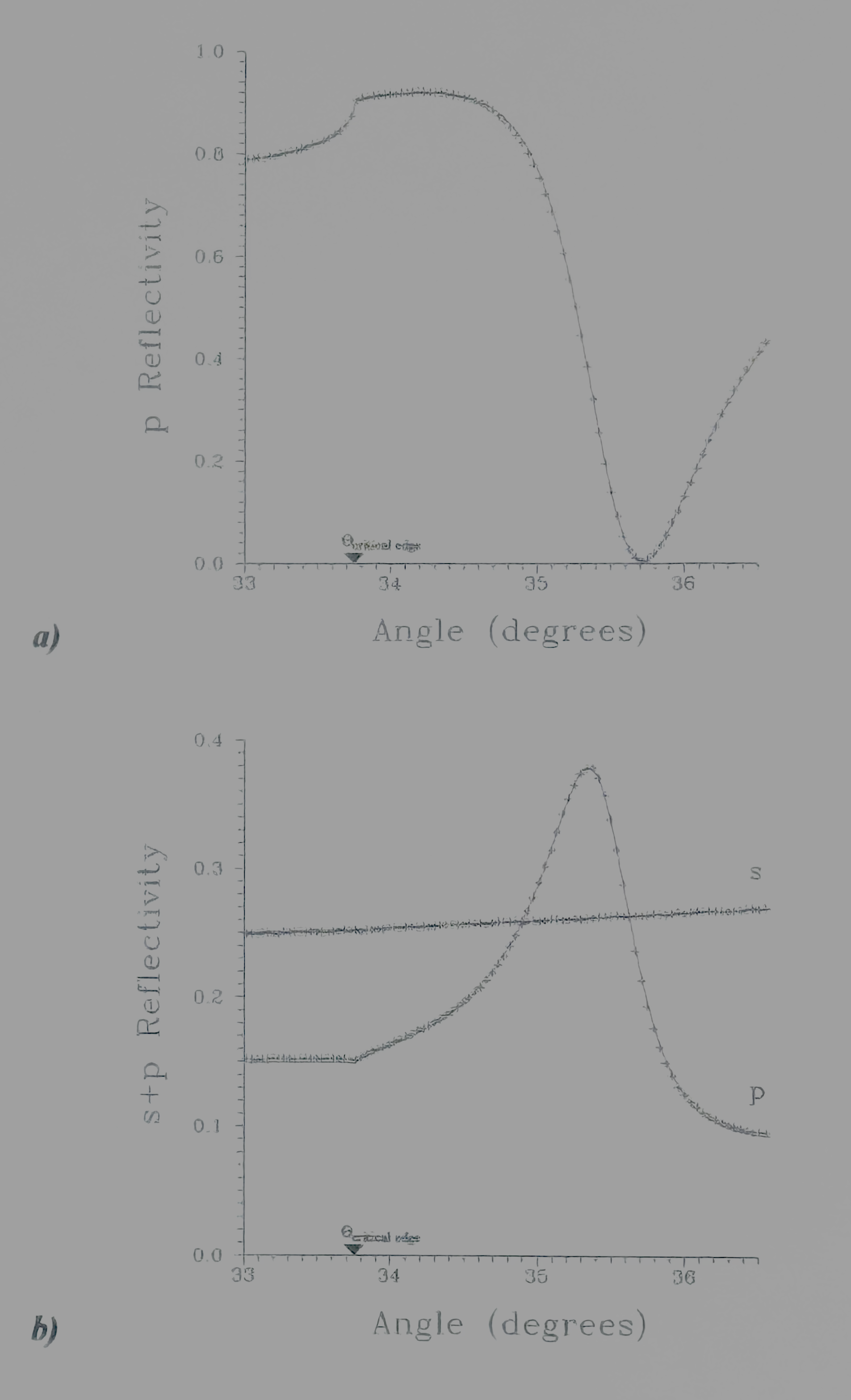
Normalised reflected intensity against angle of incidence for 632.8 nm light in the Kretschmann configuration.(a) gold-only 46.9 nm showing the common SPR minimum, (b) combined gold 46.9 nm on top of chromimum 16.9 nm showing the SPR maximum (ISPR).

SPR curves usually show a strong minimum. With the use of a combined chromium-gold film or other carefully chosen material combinations a sharp resonance maximum can be observed when exciting a surface plasmon in the Kretschmann configuration. This may be useful in sensors applications where a strong and sharp resonance above noise is required and less heat is desired at the surface.

== See also ==
- Hydrogen sensor
- Localized surface plasmon
- Multi-parametric surface plasmon resonance
- Nano-optics
- Plasmon
- Quartz crystal microbalance
- Spinplasmonics
- Spreeta
- Surface plasmon polariton
- Waves in plasmas
