= Array Collective =

Belfast-based activist group

Array Collective is the alias of 11 Belfast-based artists and activists. In 2021 they became the first Northern Irish winners of the Turner Prize.

== Work ==
Array Collective are known for projects that support "gay rights, marriage equality, feminism, reproductive rights and anti-austerity activism". The Turner Prize judges commended the group for their work to "inspire social change through art" and "working collaboratively with local communities".

Array Collective's activities have included placard-making workshops and participating in activist events and demonstrations with elaborate costumes and props.

=== The Druithaib’s Ball ===
The Druithaib’s Ball - for which they were nominated for the Turner Prize - has had several forms to date. The first was an event held at the Black Box venue in Belfast in 2021. The event was conceived as "a wake for the centenary of Ireland’s partition", "which involved a phantasmagoria of performances, stories and wild costumes bringing a carnivalesque lightness to an often dark, difficult and divided political backdrop". A second iteration of the work was installed at the 2021-22 Turner exhibition held in Coventry during its year as UK City of Culture. The installation took the form of an immersive síbín space [anglicised spelling shebeen] or a “pub without permission”, filled with banners, photographs, ashtrays, and snacks. A film of the Black Box event was shown in the síbín installation. The group imagined the space as “a place to gather outside the sectarian divides”, in reference to the historic conflict between Irish Catholics and Protestants. The performers of "The Druithaib's Ball" event and subsequent installation are Vasiliki Stasinaki, Richard O’Leary, Cleamairí Feirste, Phillip Hession, Méabh Meir and Rosa Tralee. A third was an exhibition across two sites in Galway, in 2022. The installation ran in Galway Arts Centre’s performance space, Nun’s Island Theatre, from 13 August – 30 September 2022 whilst a wider exhibition of works were displayed in Galway Arts Centre’s gallery space.

The fourth showing of the work was in their local city, Belfast, at the Ulster Museum. The museum also purchased the work for their permanent collection. Whilst the The Druithaib’s Ball was showing, there were a number of programming events including the Melt Gala, The Night Draws Near, The Sky Gives Way and a short documentary titled, Wholly Trinity was filmed inside the síbín featuring Alice Maher and Helena Walshe.

== Critical reception ==
Array's nomination and their Turner installation had a mixed critical reception. The White Pube review notes that "The whole room takes a jumble of things: queer aesthetics, performance, drag and activist aesthetics (and all the loaded meaning and weighty content that comes with them) as its main vocabulary, all in its true and messiest sense [...] The resulting work is palpable and urgent; it made me want to scream, but in a good way". The Guardian's art critic Jonathan Jones questioned the "aesthetic achievement" of the installation while noting how it represented the "work of people who deploy their gifts in useful ways far from London galleries".

The Druithaib's Ball came to viral prominence in early 2022 when a TikTok content creator uploaded an 8-second long video entitled, "Welcome to Coventry" on 12 January. The video's verbal exchange between the user and an artist in the street became a widely used TikTok sound for its wholesome and absurd delivery: "What's this?"/ "It's an art project."/"OK, I like it. Picasso. That way." As of 5 April 2022, the video has been viewed 46.7M times, and its original audio has been used by over 200K users, amassing around 989M views in total.

== Members ==
Array Collective are Sighle Bhreathnach-Cashell, Sinead Bhreathnach-Cashell, Jane Butler, Emma Campbell, Alessia Cargnelli, Mitch Conlon, Clodagh Lavelle, Grace McMurray, Stephen Millar, Laura O'Connor, Thomas Wells. Campbell, Cargnelli and O'Connor all gained Doctorates from Ulster University, and Bhreathnach-Cashell, Butler, Lavelle and Millar are all Ulster alumni.

== Exhibitions and installations ==
- November 2023 - September 2024: An Dún, a multi-narrative environment by Array Collective commissioned by IMMA for the major museum wide exhibition Self Determination: A Global Perspective, as part of The Decade of Centenaries.
- 14 February - 3 May 2025: The Goose and the Common: Array Collective presents The Goose and the Common, a new exhibition commissioned by Rua Red, Tallaght, Dublin
- 2021-2022: The Turner Prize exhibition at The Herbert, Coventry, 29 September 2021 – 12 January 2022. Array Collective also added an etching of The Druithaib's Ball into the Gallery 2 displays at The Herbert.
- October - December 2019: an installation 'As Others See Us' and a symposium 'If You Don't Play the Game, Don't Make the Rules' at Jerwood Collaborate! London.
