= Sauerbrey equation =

Equation

The Sauerbrey equation was developed by the German Günter Sauerbrey in 1959, while working on his doctoral thesis at Technische Universität Berlin, Germany. It is a method for correlating changes in the oscillation frequency of a piezoelectric crystal with the mass deposited on it. He simultaneously developed a method for measuring the characteristic frequency and its changes by using the crystal as the frequency determining component of an oscillator circuit. His method continues to be used as the primary tool in quartz crystal microbalance (QCM) experiments for conversion of frequency to mass and is valid in nearly all applications.

The equation is derived by treating the deposited mass as though it were an extension of the thickness of the underlying quartz. Because of this, the mass to frequency correlation (as determined by Sauerbrey's equation) is largely independent of electrode geometry. This has the benefit of allowing mass determination without calibration, making the set-up desirable from a cost and time investment standpoint.

The Sauerbrey equation is defined as:

$$\Delta f = -\frac{2f_0^2}{A \sqrt{ \rho_q \mu_q } }\Delta m$$

where:

$f_0$ – Resonant frequency of the fundamental mode (Hz)
$\Delta f$ – normalized frequency change (Hz)
$\Delta m$ – Mass change (g)
$A$ – Piezoelectrically active crystal area (Area between electrodes, cm^{2})
$\rho_q$ – Density of quartz ($\rho_q$ = 2.648 g/cm^{3})
$\mu_q$ – Shear modulus of quartz for AT-cut crystal ($\mu_q$ = 2.947×10^{11} g·cm^{−1}·s^{−2})

The normalized frequency $\Delta f$ is the nominal frequency shift of that mode divided by its mode number (most software outputs normalized frequency shift by default). Because the film is treated as an extension of thickness, Sauerbrey's equation only applies to systems in which the following three conditions are met: the deposited mass must be rigid, the deposited mass must be distributed evenly and the frequency change $\Delta f /f$ < 0.05.

If the change in frequency is greater than 5%, that is, $\Delta f /f$ > 0.05, the Z-match method must be used to determine the change in mass. The formula for the Z-match method is:

$$\frac{\Delta m}{A}\ = \frac{N_q \rho_q}{\pi Z f_L}\tan^{-1} \left [ Z\tan \left ( \pi \frac{f_U-f_L}{f_U} \right ) \right ]$$

Equation 2 – Z-match method

$f_L$ – Frequency of loaded crystal (Hz)
$f_U$ – Frequency of unloaded crystal, i.e. Resonant frequency (Hz)
$N_q$ – Frequency constant for AT-cut quartz crystal (1.668×10^{13}Hz·Å)
$\Delta m$ – Mass change (g)
$A$ – Piezoelectrically active crystal area (Area between electrodes, cm^{2})
$\rho_q$ – Density of quartz ($\rho_q$ = 2.648 g/cm^{3})
$Z$ – Z-Factor of film material $= \sqrt{ \left ( \frac{\rho_q\mu_q}{\rho_f\mu_f}\ \right ) }$
$\rho_f$ – Density of the film (Varies: units are g/cm^{3})
$\mu_q$ – Shear modulus of quartz ($\mu_q$ = 2.947×10^{11} g·cm^{−1}·s^{−2})
$\mu_f$ – Shear modulus of film (Varies: units are g·cm^{−1}·s^{−2})

== Limitations ==
The Sauerbrey equation was developed for oscillation in air and only applies to rigid masses attached to the crystal. It has been shown that quartz crystal microbalance measurements can be performed in liquid, in which case a viscosity related decrease in the resonant frequency will be observed:

$$\Delta f = { -\ f_0^{3/2} ( \eta_l \rho_l / \pi \rho_q \mu_q n )^{1/2} }$$

where $\rho_l$ is the density of the liquid, $\eta_l$ is the viscosity of the liquid, and $n$ is the mode number.
