= Günter Sauerbrey =

German physicist (1933–2003)

Günter Hans Sauerbrey
- Born: Günter Hans Sauerbrey; January 4, 1933; Tiefenort, Germany
- Died: May 15, 2003 (aged 70); Germany
- Known for: Quartz crystal microbalance Sauerbrey equation Sauerbrey constant Sauerbrey layer Sauerbrey mass Sauerbrey thickness
- Scientific career
- Institutions: Technische Universität Berlin, Physikalisch-Technische Bundesanstalt
- Thesis: (1959)

Günter Hans Sauerbrey (January 4, 1933 – May 15, 2003) was a German physicist who invented the quartz crystal microbalance (QCM).

== Biography ==
Günter Sauerbrey obtained his Ph.D from Technische Universität Berlin. He was responsible of the Laboratory of Medical Techniques and Dosimetry of the Physikalisch-Technische Bundesanstalt (PTB) in Berlin for 24 years (from 1974 to 1998).

=== Research contributions ===
Günter Sauerbrey invented the quartz crystal microbalance. He developed the research related to QCM in his doctoral thesis at Technische Universität Berlin and published it in two seminal papers in 1957 and 1959. He was the first to use a harmonic acceleration field to measure mass, although he was not aware of this at the time of publication.

Together with the quartz crystal microbalance, he developed the Sauerbrey equation to explain the working principle of the device. Later, other authors developed derivative equations for different cases.

== See also ==
- Sauerbrey constant
- Sauerbrey layer
- Sauerbrey mass
- Sauerbrey thickness
