= Multi-parametric surface plasmon resonance =

Multi-parametric surface plasmon resonance (MP-SPR) is based on surface plasmon resonance (SPR), an established real-time label-free method for biomolecular interaction analysis, but it uses a different optical setup, a goniometric SPR configuration. While MP-SPR provides the same kinetic information as SPR (equilibrium constant, dissociation constant, association constant), it provides also structural information (refractive index, layer thickness). Hence, MP-SPR measures both surface interactions and nanolayer properties.

== History ==
The goniometric SPR method was researched alongside focused beam SPR and Otto configurations at VTT Technical Research Centre of Finland since 1980s by Janusz Sadowski. The goniometric SPR optics was commercialized by Biofons Oy for use in point-of-care applications. Introduction of additional measurement laser wavelengths and first thin film analyses were performed in 2011 giving way to MP-SPR method.

== Principle ==
The MP-SPR optical setup measures at multiple wavelengths simultaneously (similarly to spectroscopic SPR), but instead of measuring at a fixed angle, it rather scans across a wide range of θ angles (for instance 40 degrees). This results in measurements of full SPR curves at multiple wavelengths providing additional information about structure and dynamic conformation of the film.

== Measured values ==
The measured full SPR curves (x-axis: angle, y-axis: reflected light intensity) can be transcribed into sensograms (x-axis: time, y-axis: selected parameter such as peak minimum, light intensity, peak width). The sensograms can be fitted using binding models to obtain kinetic parameters including on- and off-rates and affinity. The full SPR curves are used to fit Fresnel equations to obtain thickness and refractive index of the layers. Also due to the ability of scanning the whole SPR curve, MP-SPR is able to separate bulk effect and analyte binding from each other using parameters of the curve.

Molecular interactions	Layer properties
Kinetics, PureKinetics (k_{on}, k_{off})	Refractive index (n)
Affinity (K_{D})	Thickness (d)
Concentration (c)	Extinction coefficient (k)
Adsorption/Absorption	Density (ρ)
Desorption	Surface coverage (Γ)
Adhesion	Swelling (Δd)
Electrochemistry (E, I, omega)	Optical dispersion (n(λ))

While QCM-D measures wet mass, MP-SPR and other optical methods measure dry mass, which enables analysis of water content of nanocellulose films.

== Applications ==
The method has been used in life sciences, material sciences and biosensor development. In life sciences, the main applications focus on pharmaceutical development including small-molecule, antibody or nanoparticle interactions with target with a biomembrane or with a living cell monolayer. As first in the world, MP-SPR is able to separate transcellular and paracellular drug uptake in real-time and label-free for targeted drug delivery. In biosensor development, MP-SPR is used for assay development for point-of-care applications. Typical developed biosensors include electrochemical printed biosensors, ELISA and SERS. In material sciences, MP-SPR is used for optimization of thin solid films from Ångströms to 100 nanometers (graphene, metals, oxides), soft materials up to microns (nanocellulose, polyelectrolyte) including nanoparticles. Applications including thin film solar cells, barrier coatings including anti-reflective coatings, antimicrobial surfaces, self-cleaning glass, plasmonic metamaterials, electro-switching surfaces, layer-by-layer assembly, and graphene.
