= Linear diode array =

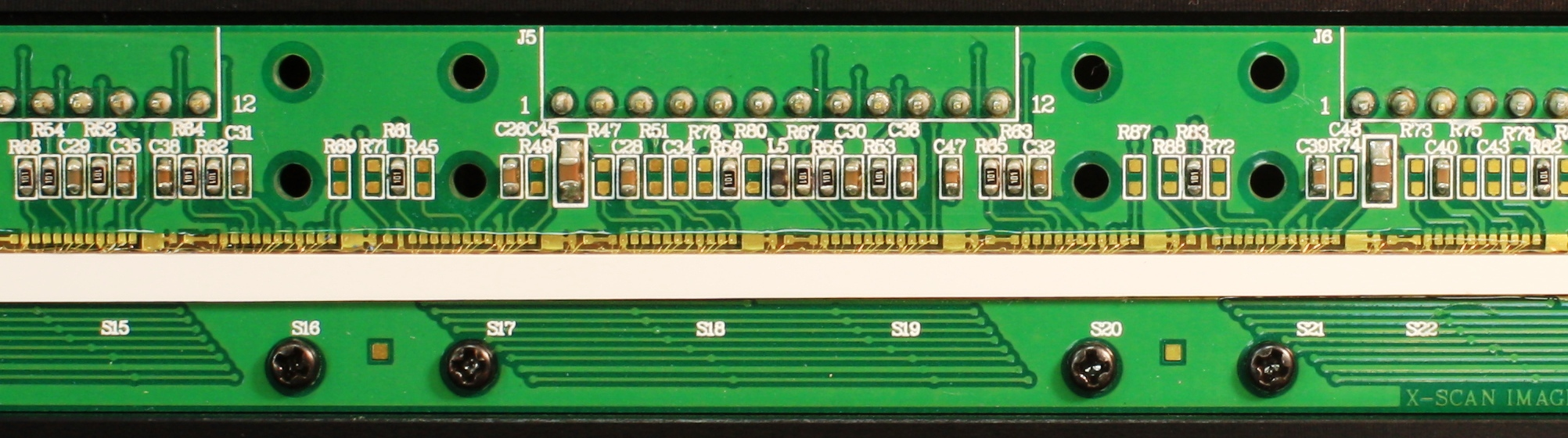
Part of a 12-inch (304 mm) 50-micrometre-resolution linear diode array XB8850-12 made by X-Scan Imaging Corporation; a horizontal, white scintillator strip overlays a linear silicon-integrated photodiode array mounted by chip-on-board surface-mount technology onto a green printed circuit board

A linear diode array is the X-ray detecting element of a pixelated X-ray line-scan camera or 1-D imaging X-ray detector.

The input of an LDA system is a photodiode module. Each module contains multiple (32 to 256) photodiodes arranged in a short line segment (2 inches). Multiple modules are tiled in one row, aligned to arrange the photodiodes inside them into one long sensitive line, up to 32 inches or more. The photodiodes are laminated with a scintillation screen to make them sensitive to X-rays. The scintillation screen converts the photon energy of any X-rays (or gamma rays) that strike it into visible light, which is coupled to the photodiodes in contact with it. Each photodiode produces a voltage or current proportional to the light energy it receives. The LDA usually multiplexes the voltages into one or more analog-to-digital converters. It then sends the digital values (pixel data) to a computer for optional correction, averaging, and filtering, followed by human viewing and interpretation, digital image analysis, and digital storage.

== Uses ==
A typical LDA continuously acquires 1-dimensional X-ray images. While X-rays are on, a computer usually concatenates many incoming line images into one large 2-D image. With linear motion, the 2-D image is a 2-D projection (with a unique property). With rotation, the 2-D image can be one sinogram (useful for single-slice computed tomography); one unwrapogram (with the LDA turned 90 degrees) (useful for other special projections). With both linear motion and rotation, the acquired 3-D data set can be orthogonally sliced into projections, sinograms, or unwrapograms, in both cases below:

- With the LDA perpendicular to the axis of rotation and linear motion parallel to it, the set of sinograms can be reconstructed into multiple slices. Tightening the collimator allows smaller slice thickness, but resolution within each slice is fixed.
- With the LDA parallel to the axis of rotation and continuous linear motion perpendicular to it, the entire data set can be reconstructed into a volume. Tightening the collimator allows smaller resolution within each slice, but slice thickness is fixed.

Advantages:

- When an X-ray fan beam shines onto on LDA, most of the X-rays that are scattered by the object go out of the plane and do not reach the detector. Eliminating the scattered X-rays makes a superior image for most uses.
- An LDA-based system can take seamless images of objects with unlimited length.
- With a linear scanning motion, the assembled image is an unusual projection. In a level scan of an industrial steel drum, the top and bottom appear parallel. This is impossible in any single all-at-once X-ray image. Horizontal distances project in perspective (magnification varies), but vertical distances project as constant (isometric perspective).
- With a rotary scanning motion, a system can produce "unwrapped" images of cylindrical, spherical, and conical objects (pipes, tanks, and wheels).
- LDA-based systems acquired wide, long (32 inches and more by 46 inches and more) seamless digital X-ray images, in near-real time, years before other means (large flat-panel imagers) finally approached such large sizes.

Disadvantages:

- The LDA's X-ray "beam utilization" is quite low. Nothing can "focus" X-rays. Every beam-limiting device ("X-ray collimator") wastes non-useful X-rays by absorbing them. The planar fan beam is a tiny fraction of the rectangular beam used by 2-dimensional imagers.
- Acquiring an image of an area takes the time of the scan, whereas a 2-D X-ray detector can receive an image of an area instantly (as short as a few nanoseconds using a flash X-ray source) and read it out in milliseconds.
- The necessary motion of the object during imaging blurs the image by one line-height which is one row of the image. (Stop-start imaging could remove this blur, but it would at-least double the scan time.)

Similar devices achieve beam utilization multiple times that of the LDA concept by using a taller fan beam and arranging multiple (16 to 64) rows of photodiodes to receive it. These can be described as multi-row LDAs or 2-D "strip detectors". With linear motion, each 2-D image must be added into the right part of a full-sized 2-D image buffer. This is a digital variant of time delay and integration (TDI). Increasing the number rows eventually reduces the depth of field of the TDI image; that must be checked, and the speed must be precise to keep the image from blurring everywhere. Depth-of-field can be made infinite by moving the object in a curved path (a circle around the X-ray focal spot) at one precise speed. With even more rows, that method breaks down because the 2-D detector is planar, but it wants a cylindrical image. That could be corrected by making a cylindrical 2-D detector (or a planar detector with curved rows) or by transforming the data collected from a planar detector.
