= Array Networks =

American company

- Type: Public
- Industry: Application Delivery Controller & Cybersecurity
- Founded: 2000
- Headquarters: Milpitas, California
- Products: APV Series Application Delivery Controllers(Secure ADC), ASF Web Application Firewall & DDOS, AG Series SSL VPN Solution, AVX Series Virtualised Appliances (Network HCI), NTB Network Traffic Broker, IDPASS Passwordless Authentication Solution, WAN Optimisation Controllers, StruXture DLP & Classification
- Website: Official website

Array Networks is an American networking hardware company. It sells network traffic encryption tools.

Array Networks was founded in 2000 by Lawrence Lu and is based in Milpitas, California. Originally called ClickArray Networks, it was renamed Array Networks in 2001 by then-incoming CEO Don Massaro who said the longer name "sounded too dot-commy". It received funding from the venture capital firm U.S. Venture Partners and the private equity firm H&Q Asia Pacific.

On May 13, 2009, Array Networks became the first non-Taiwan company to be listed on the Taiwan Stock Exchange. The company sold 54 million shares that had a total value of about $79 million. In 2009, 43% of the company's market share was in China, and its main product type sold there consisted of SSL VPN devices. It also had 200 employees in China, which CEO Michael Zhao said made China a "natural choice" for an IPO, In comparison, the company had 70 employees in Silicon Valley. but because China did not allow non-Chinese companies on their exchange, he narrowed the choices down to the NASDAQ and the Taiwan Stock Exchange. He chose the Taiwan Stock Exchange for two reasons: Array Networks had a strong business presence in Asia, and Taiwan Stock Exchange's listing fees were at least one third less than the NASDAQ's.

In 2011, CRN Magazine noted that most of Array Networks' sales is from Asia and that the company is "particularly strong" in China, Japan, and India.

In 2023 Array Networks Partnered with Aircom Global Limited, a company with operations in Tanzania.

== Products ==
=== APV series application delivery controllers ===
In 2008, Array Networks first released its AppVelocity devices that consisted of application delivery controllers for SSL acceleration, load balancing and traffic managementat layers 2-7 for enterprise data centers and Web sites. Later devices were introduced in 2013, 2014, and 2015.

=== Application Security Firewall & DDoS Attack Mitigation ===
Array sells ASF Series, a product for web application security in L4 & L7 considering OWASP Top Ten attack mitigation and support both security model (Negative & Positive). ASF can also offer a dedicated DDoS mitigation engine (Inline & Out of Path-L7) and can detect and mitigate DDoS attacks.

=== AG series VPN gateways ===
Array sells VPN gateways.

=== Remote Desktop Access ===
Array sells DesktopDirect which enables remote desktop access in a web browser.

=== Secure Mobile Access ===
Array sells MotionPro, a product for remote desktop access via personal mobile devices.

=== Array ASI Series SSL Interceptor ===
Array SSL intercept provides enterprises with visibility into encrypted traffic entering, leaving, and traversing their network. Deployed in conjunction with solutions such as next-generation firewalls, network monitoring, and intrusion detection and prevention, SSL intercept offloads compute-intensive decryption and re-encryption tasks to allow essential security functions to operate at scale. SSLi is an ideal solution for optimizing both security and infrastructure efficiency.

=== Array AVX Networks Functions Virtualization Platform ===
Array sells AVX Series network functions platform provides guaranteed resources – including SSL processing resources – to help ensure the performance of these critical security functions. Array network hyperconverged infrastructure platforms provide the agility of virtualization combined with the performance of purpose-built networking and security hardware. Deployed in the enterprise or service provider data center, the AVX enables consolidation of services such as next-generation firewalls, SSL VPNs, load balancing, web application firewalls, IPS/IDS and other network services either from Array or other 3rd-party vendors.

=== Array Network Traffic Broker ===
Array sels NTB solutions which provide Intelligent Network Visibility & Monitoring Massive Traffic. Array NTB, the network visibility platform powered by xUDN embedded network OS, Array NTB is specialized to identify and resolve network performance issues by providing insights into application behaviour, traffic patterns, and network bottlenecks.
