= Dual-polarization interferometry =

Analytical technique that probes molecular layers adsorbed to the surface of a waveguide

Dual-polarization interferometry (DPI) is an analytical technique that probes molecular layers adsorbed to the surface of a waveguide using the evanescent wave of a laser beam. It is used to measure the conformational change in proteins, or other biomolecules, as they function (referred to as the conformation activity relationship).

== Instrumentation ==
DPI focuses laser light into two waveguides. One of these functions as the "sensing" waveguide having an exposed surface while the second one functions to maintain a reference beam. A two-dimensional interference pattern is formed in the far field by combining the light passing through the two waveguides. The DPI technique rotates the polarization of the laser, to alternately excite two polarization modes of the waveguides. Measurement of the interferogram for both polarizations allows both the refractive index and the thickness of the adsorbed layer to be calculated. The polarization can be switched rapidly, allowing real-time measurements of chemical reactions taking place on a chip surface chemistry in a flow-through system. These measurements can be used to infer conformational information about the molecular interactions taking place, as the molecule size (from the layer thickness) and the fold density (from the RI) change. DPI is typically used to characterize biochemical interactions by quantifying any conformational change at the same time as measuring reaction rates, affinities and thermodynamics.

The technique is quantitative and real-time (10Hz) with a dimensional resolution of 0.01nm.

Extensions of dual-polarization interferometry also exist, namely multiple pathlength dual-polarization interferometry (MPL-DPI) and absorption enhanced DPI. In MPL-DPI quantification of both layer thickness and refractive index (density) and therefore mass per unit area can be made for in situ and ex-situ coated films, where normal DPI can only calculate film properties if the interferogram is constantly monitored. Absorption enhanced DPI (AE-DPI) is used to separate the mass of different molecules on the surface, exploiting the absorption of one of the molecular species compared to the other species on the surface.

== Applications ==
A novel application for dual-polarization interferometry emerged in 2008, where the intensity of light passing through the waveguide is extinguished in the presence of crystal growth. This has allowed the very earliest stages in protein crystal nucleation to be monitored. Later versions of dual-polarization interferometers also have the capability to quantify the order and disruption in birefringent thin films. This has been used, for example, to study the formation of lipid bilayers and their interaction with membrane proteins.
