= Biotransducer =

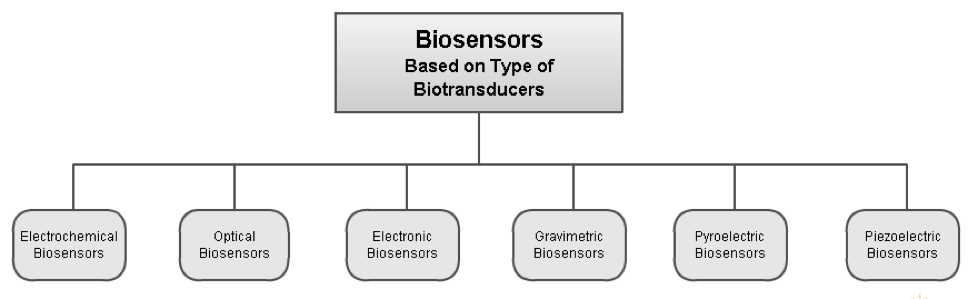
Biosensors based on type of biotransducers

A biotransducer is the recognition-transduction component of a biosensor system. It consists of two intimately coupled parts: a bio-recognition layer and a physicochemical transducer, which act together to convert a biochemical signal to an electronic or optical signal. The bio-recognition layer typically contains an enzyme or another binding protein, such as an antibody. However, oligonucleotide sequences, sub-cellular fragments such as organelles (e.g. mitochondria) and receptor-carrying fragments (e.g. cell wall), single whole cells, small numbers of cells on synthetic scaffolds, or thin slices of animal or plant tissues may also comprise the bio-recognition layer. It gives the biosensor selectivity and specificity. The physicochemical transducer is typically in intimate and controlled contact with the recognition layer. As a result of the presence and biochemical action of the analyte (target of interest), a physicochemical change is produced within the biorecognition layer that is measured by the physicochemical transducer, producing a signal that is proportionate to the concentration of the analyte. The physicochemical transducer may be electrochemical, optical, electronic, gravimetric, pyroelectric, or piezoelectric. Based on the type of biotransducer, biosensors can be classified as shown to the right.

== Electrochemical biotransducers ==
Electrochemical biosensors contain a biorecognition element that selectively reacts with the target analyte and produces an electrical signal that is proportional to the analyte concentration. In general, there are several approaches that can be used to detect electrochemical changes during a biorecognition event and these can be classified as follows: amperometric, potentiometric, impedance, and conductometric.

=== Amperometric ===
Amperometric transducers detect change in current as a result of electrochemical oxidation or reduction. Typically, the bioreceptor molecule is immobilized on the working electrode (commonly gold, carbon, or platinum). The potential between the working electrode and the reference electrode (usually Ag/AgCl) is fixed at a value and then current is measured with respect to time. The applied potential is the driving force for the electron transfer reaction. The current produced is a direct measure of the rate of electron transfer. The current reflects the reaction occurring between the bioreceptor molecule and analyte and is limited by the mass transport rate of the analyte to the electrode.

=== Potentiometric ===
Potentiometric sensors measure a potential or charge accumulation of an electrochemical cell. The transducer typically comprises an ion selective electrode (ISE) and a reference electrode. The ISE features a membrane that selectively interacts with the charged ion of interest, causing the accumulation of a charge potential compared to the reference electrode. The reference electrode provides a constant half-cell potential that is unaffected by analyte concentration. A high impedance voltmeter is used to measure the electromotive force or potential between the two electrodes when zero or no significant current flows between them. The potentiometric response is governed by the Nernst equation in that the potential is proportional to the logarithm of the concentration of the analyte.

=== Impedance ===
Electrochemical impedance spectroscopy (EIS) involves measuring resistive and capacitive changes caused by a biorecognition event. Typically, a small amplitude sinusoidal electrical stimulus is applied, causing current to flow through the biosensor. The frequency is varied over a range to obtain the impedance spectrum. The resistive and capacitive components of impedance are determined from in phase and out of phase current responses. Typically, a conventional three-electrode system is made specific to the analyte by immobilizing a biorecognition element to the surface. A voltage is applied and the current is measured. The interfacial impedance between the electrode and solution changes as a result of the analyte binding. An impedance analyzer can be used to control and apply the stimulus as well as measure the impedance changes.

=== Conductometry ===
Conductometric sensing involves measuring the change in conductive properties of the sample solution or a medium. The reaction between the biomolecule and analyte changes the ionic species concentration, leading to a change in the solution electrical conductivity or current flow. Two metal electrodes are separated at a certain distance and an AC potential is applied across the electrodes, causing a current flow between the electrodes. During a biorecognition event the ionic composition changes, using an ohmmeter the change in conductance can be measured.

== Optical biotransducers ==
Optical biotransducers, used in optical biosensors for signal transduction, use photons in order to collect information about analyte. These are highly sensitive, highly specific, small in size and cost effective.

The detection mechanism of optical biotransducer depends upon the enzyme system that converts analyte into products which are either oxidized or reduced at the working electrode.

Evanescent field detection principle is most commonly used in an optical biosensor system as the transduction principle . This principle is one of the most sensitive detection methods. It enables the detection of fluorophores exclusively in the close proximity of the optical fiber.

== FET-based electronic biotransducers ==
Electronic biosensing offers significant advantages over optical, biochemical and biophysical methods, in terms of high sensitivity and new sensing mechanisms, high spatial resolution for localized detection, facile integration with standard wafer-scale semiconductor processing and label-free, real-time detection in a nondestructive manner [6].

Devices based on field-effect transistors (FETs) have attracted great attention because they can directly translate the interactions between target biological molecules and the FET surface into readable electrical signals. In a FET, current flows along the channel which is connected to the source and the drain. The channel conductance between the source and the drain is switched on and off by gate electrode that is capacitively coupled through a thin dielectric layer [6].

In FET-based biosensors, the channel is in direct contact with the environment, and this gives better control over the surface charge. This improves the sensitivity of surface FET-based biosensors as biological events occurring at the channel surface could result in the surface potential variation of the semiconductor channel and then modulate the channel conductance. In addition to ease of on-chip integration of device arrays and the cost-effective device fabrication, the surface ultrasensitivity of FET-based biosensors makes it an attractive alternative to existing biosensor technologies[6].

== Gravimetric/Piezoelectric biotransducers ==
Gravimetric biosensors use the basic principle of a response to a change in mass. Most gravimetric biosensors use thin piezoelectric quartz crystals, either as resonating crystals (QCM), or as bulk/surface acoustic wave (SAW) devices. In the majority of these the mass response is inversely proportional to the crystal thickness. Thin polymer films are also used in which biomolecules can be added to the surface with known surface mass. Acoustic waves can be projected to the thin film to produce an oscillatory device, which then follows an equation that is nearly identical to the Sauerbrey equation used in the QCM method. Biomolecules, such as proteins or antibodies can bind and its change in mass gives a measureable signal proportional to the presence of the target analyte in the sample.

== Pyroelectric biotransducers ==
Pyroelectric biosensors generate an electric current as a result of a temperature change. This differential induces a polarization in the substance, producing a dipole moment in the direction of the temperature gradient. The result is a net voltage across the material. This net voltage can be calculated by the following equation.

$\Delta V = \omega PAr\Delta T\left(1+\omega^2\tau_E^2\right)^{-1/2}$

$\tau_E=rC$

where V = Voltage, ω = angular frequency of the modulated incident, P = pyroelectric coefficient, L = film thickness, ε = film dielectric constant, A = area of film, r = resistance of the film, C = capacitance of the film, τE = electrical time constant of the detector output.

== See also ==
- Biosensor
- DNA field-effect transistor
- Biointerface
- Electrochemiluminescence
- Bioelectronics
- Nanobiotechnology
