= Biosensor =

Probe which tests for biological molecules

A biosensor (or nanobiosensor in the nanoscale) is an analytical device, used for the detection of a chemical substance, that combines a biological component with a physicochemical detector.

The sensitive biological element, e.g. tissue, microorganisms, organelles, cell receptors, enzymes, antibodies, nucleic acids, etc., is a biologically derived material or biomimetic component that interacts with, binds with, or recognizes the analyte under study. The biologically sensitive elements can also be created by biological engineering. By contrast, the transducer or the detector element, which transforms one signal into another one, works in a physicochemical way: optical, piezoelectric, electrochemical, electrochemiluminescence etc., resulting from the interaction of the analyte with the biological element, to easily measure and quantify.

The biosensor reader device connects with the associated electronics or signal processors that are primarily responsible for the display of the results in a user-friendly way. This sometimes accounts for the most expensive part of the sensor device, however it is possible to generate a user friendly display that includes transducer and sensitive element (holographic sensor). The readers are usually custom-designed and manufactured to suit the different working principles of biosensors.

== Biosensor system ==
A biosensor typically consists of a bio-receptor (enzyme/antibody/cell/nucleic acid/aptamer), transducer component (semi-conducting material/nanomaterial), and electronic system which includes a signal amplifier, processor & display. Transducers and electronics can be combined, e.g., in CMOS-based microsensor systems. The recognition component, often called a bioreceptor, uses biomolecules from organisms or receptors modeled after biological systems to interact with the analyte of interest. This interaction is measured by the biotransducer which outputs a measurable signal proportional to the presence of the target analyte in the sample. The general aim of the design of a biosensor is to enable quick, convenient testing at the point of concern or care where the sample was procured.

== Bioreceptors ==
Biosensors used for screening combinatorial DNA libraries

In a biosensor, the bioreceptor is designed to interact with the specific analyte of interest to produce an effect measurable by the transducer. High selectivity for the analyte among a matrix of other chemical or biological components is a key requirement of the bioreceptor. While the type of biomolecule used can vary widely, biosensors can be classified according to common types of bioreceptor interactions involving: antibody/antigen, enzymes/ligands, nucleic acids/DNA, cellular structures/cells, or biomimetic materials.

=== Antibody/antigen interactions ===
An immunosensor utilizes the very specific binding affinity of antibodies for a specific compound or antigen. The specific nature of the antibody-antigen interaction is analogous to a lock and key fit in that the antigen will only bind to the antibody if it has the correct conformation. Binding events result in a physicochemical change that in combination with a tracer, such as fluorescent molecules, enzymes, or radioisotopes, can generate a signal. There are limitations with using antibodies in sensors: 1. The antibody binding capacity is strongly dependent on assay conditions (e.g. pH and temperature), and 2. the antibody-antigen interaction is generally robust, however, binding can be disrupted by chaotropic reagents, organic solvents, or even ultrasonic radiation.

Antibody-antigen interactions can also be used for serological testing, or the detection of circulating antibodies in response to a specific disease. Importantly, serology tests have become an important part of the global response to the COVID-19 pandemic.

=== Artificial binding proteins ===
The use of antibodies as the bio-recognition component of biosensors has several drawbacks. They have high molecular weights and limited stability, contain essential disulfide bonds and are expensive to produce. In one approach to overcome these limitations, recombinant binding fragments (Fab, Fv or scFv) or domains (VH, VHH) of antibodies have been engineered. In another approach, small protein scaffolds with favorable biophysical properties have been engineered to generate artificial families of Antigen Binding Proteins (AgBP), capable of specific binding to different target proteins while retaining the favorable properties of the parent molecule. The elements of the family that specifically bind to a given target antigen, are often selected in vitro by display techniques: phage display, ribosome display, yeast display or mRNA display. The artificial binding proteins are much smaller than antibodies (usually less than 100 amino-acid residues), have a strong stability, lack disulfide bonds and can be expressed in high yield in reducing cellular environments like the bacterial cytoplasm, contrary to antibodies and their derivatives. They are thus especially suitable to create biosensors.

=== Enzymatic interactions ===
The specific binding capabilities and catalytic activity of enzymes make them popular bioreceptors. Analyte recognition is enabled through several possible mechanisms: 1) the enzyme converting the analyte into a product that is sensor-detectable, 2) detecting enzyme inhibition or activation by the analyte, or 3) monitoring modification of enzyme properties resulting from interaction with the analyte. The main reasons for the common use of enzymes in biosensors are: 1) ability to catalyze a large number of reactions; 2) potential to detect a group of analytes (substrates, products, inhibitors, and modulators of the catalytic activity); and 3) suitability with several different transduction methods for detecting the analyte. Notably, since enzymes are not consumed in reactions, the biosensor can easily be used continuously. The catalytic activity of enzymes also allows lower limits of detection compared to common binding techniques. However, the sensor's lifetime is limited by the stability of the enzyme.

=== Affinity binding receptors ===
Antibodies have a high binding constant in excess of 10^8 L/mol, which stands for a nearly irreversible association once the antigen-antibody couple has formed. For certain analyte molecules like glucose affinity binding proteins exist that bind their ligand with a high specificity like an antibody, but with a much smaller binding constant on the order of 10^2 to 10^4 L/mol. The association between analyte and receptor then is of reversible nature and next to the couple between both also their free molecules occur in a measurable concentration. In case of glucose, for instance, concanavalin A may function as affinity receptor exhibiting a binding constant of 4x10^2 L/mol. The use of affinity binding receptors for purposes of biosensing has been proposed by Schultz and Sims in 1979 and was subsequently configured into a fluorescent assay for measuring glucose in the relevant physiological range between 4.4 and 6.1 mmol/L. The sensor principle has the advantage that it does not consume the analyte in a chemical reaction as occurs in enzymatic assays. Affinity biosensors have been used to characterize antibody–lipoprotein binding kinetics and thermodynamics.

=== Nucleic acid interactions ===
Biosensors employing nucleic acid based receptors can be either based on complementary base pairing interactions referred to as genosensors or specific nucleic acid based antibody mimics (aptamers) as aptasensors. In the former, the recognition process is based on the principle of complementary base pairing, adenine:thymine and cytosine:guanine in DNA. If the target nucleic acid sequence is known, complementary sequences can be synthesized, labeled, and then immobilized on the sensor. The hybridization event can be optically detected and presence of target DNA/RNA ascertained. In the latter, aptamers generated against the target recognise it via interplay of specific non-covalent interactions and induced fitting. These aptamers can be labelled with a fluorophore/metal nanoparticles easily for optical detection or may be employed for label-free electrochemical or cantilever based detection platforms for a wide range of target molecules or complex targets like cells and viruses. Additionally, aptamers can be combined with nucleic acid enzymes, such as RNA-cleaving DNAzymes, providing both target recognition and signal generation in a single molecule, which shows potential applications in the development of multiplex biosensors.

=== Epigenetics ===
It has been proposed that properly optimized integrated optical resonators can be exploited for detecting epigenetic modifications (e.g. DNA methylation, histone post-translational modifications) in body fluids from patients affected by cancer or other diseases. Photonic biosensors with ultra-sensitivity are nowadays being developed at a research level to easily detect cancerous cells within the patient's urine. Different research projects aim to develop new portable devices that use cheap, environmentally friendly, disposable cartridges that require only simple handling with no need of further processing, washing, or manipulation by expert technicians.

=== Organelles ===
Organelles form separate compartments inside cells and usually perform functions independently. Different kinds of organelles have various metabolic pathways and contain enzymes to fulfill its function. Commonly used organelles include lysosome, chloroplast and mitochondria. The spatial-temporal distribution pattern of calcium is closely related to ubiquitous signaling pathway. Mitochondria actively participate in the metabolism of calcium ions to control the function and also modulate the calcium related signaling pathways. Experiments have proved that mitochondria have the ability to respond to high calcium concentrations generated in their proximity by opening the calcium channels. In this way, mitochondria can be used to detect the calcium concentration in medium and the detection is very sensitive due to high spatial resolution. Another application of mitochondria is used for detection of water pollution. Detergent compounds' toxicity will damage the cell and subcellular structure including mitochondria. The detergents will cause a swelling effect which could be measured by an absorbance change. Experiment data shows the change rate is proportional to the detergent concentration, providing a high standard for detection accuracy.

=== Cells ===
Cells are often used in bioreceptors because they are sensitive to surrounding environment and they can respond to all kinds of stimulants. Cells tend to attach to the surface so they can be easily immobilized. Compared to organelles they remain active for longer period and the reproducibility makes them reusable. They are commonly used to detect global parameter like stress condition, toxicity and organic derivatives. They can also be used to monitor the treatment effect of drugs. One application is to use cells to determine herbicides which are main aquatic contaminant. Microalgae are entrapped on a quartz microfiber and the chlorophyll fluorescence modified by herbicides is collected at the tip of an optical fiber bundle and transmitted to a fluorimeter. The algae are continuously cultured to get optimized measurement. Results show that detection limit of certain herbicide can reach sub-ppb concentration level. Some cells can also be used to monitor the microbial corrosion. Pseudomonas sp. is isolated from corroded material surface and immobilized on acetylcellulose membrane. The respiration activity is determined by measuring oxygen consumption. There is linear relationship between the current generated and the concentration of sulfuric acid. The response time is related to the loading of cells and surrounding environments and can be controlled to no more than 5min.

=== Tissue ===
Tissues are used for biosensor for the abundance of enzymes existing. Advantages of tissues as biosensors include the following:

- easier to immobilize compared to cells and organelles
- the higher activity and stability from maintaining enzymes in the natural environment
- the availability and low price
- the avoidance of tedious work of extraction, centrifuge, and purification of enzymes
- necessary cofactors for an enzyme to function exists
- the diversity providing a wide range of choices concerning different objectives.

There also exist some disadvantages of tissues, like the lack of specificity due to the interference of other enzymes and longer response time due to the transport barrier.

=== Microbial biosensors ===
Microbial biosensors exploit the response of bacteria to a given substance. For example, arsenic can be detected using the ars operon found in several bacterial taxon.

== Surface attachment of the biological elements ==
Sensing negatively charged exosomes bound a graphene surface

An important part of a biosensor is to attach the biological elements (small molecules/protein/cells) to the surface of the sensor (be it metal, polymer, or glass). The simplest way is to functionalize the surface in order to coat it with the biological elements. This can be done by polylysine, aminosilane, epoxysilane, or nitrocellulose in the case of silicon chips/silica glass. Subsequently, the bound biological agent may also be fixed—for example, by layer by layer deposition of alternatively charged polymer coatings.

Alternatively, three-dimensional lattices (hydrogel/xerogel) can be used to chemically or physically entrap these (whereby chemically entrapped it is meant that the biological element is kept in place by a strong bond, while physically they are kept in place being unable to pass through the pores of the gel matrix). The most commonly used hydrogel is sol-gel, glassy silica generated by polymerization of silicate monomers (added as tetra alkyl orthosilicates, such as TMOS or TEOS) in the presence of the biological elements (along with other stabilizing polymers, such as PEG) in the case of physical entrapment.

Another group of hydrogels, which set under conditions suitable for cells or protein, are acrylate hydrogel, which polymerizes upon radical initiation. One type of radical initiator is a peroxide radical, typically generated by combining a persulfate with TEMED (Polyacrylamide gel are also commonly used for protein electrophoresis), alternatively light can be used in combination with a photoinitiator, such as DMPA (2,2-dimethoxy-2-phenylacetophenone). Smart materials that mimic the biological components of a sensor can also be classified as biosensors using only the active or catalytic site or analogous configurations of a biomolecule.

== Biotransducer ==
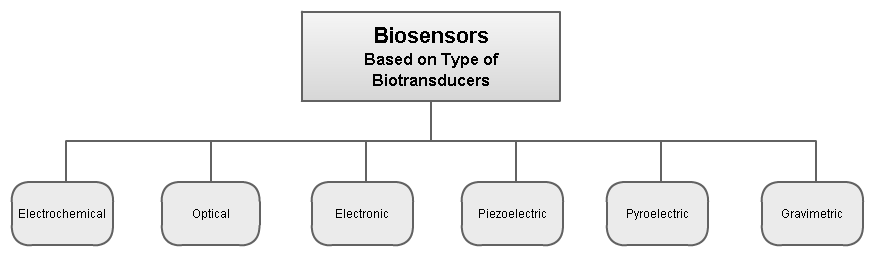
Classification of biosensors based on type of biotransducer

Biosensors can be classified by their biotransducer type. The most common types of biotransducers used in biosensors are:

- electrochemical biosensors
- optical biosensors
- electronic biosensors
- piezoelectric biosensors
- gravimetric biosensors
- pyroelectric biosensors
- magnetic biosensors

== Electrochemical Biosensors ==
Electrochemical biosensors combine the exquisite selectivity of biological recognition elements with the high sensitivity and rapid response times of electrochemical transduction. To understand their design and application, these systems can be systematically categorized by their electrical measurement techniques and their biorecognition mechanisms.

=== 1. Classification by Electrochemical Measurement Technique ===
Electrochemical biosensors are broadly divided into active techniques (which force a current or voltage change upon the system to measure a dynamic response) and passive techniques (which measure a system at equilibrium or under resting conditions).

==== A. Active Measurement Techniques ====
- Amperometric and Voltammetric Biosensors: These systems apply a controlled electrical potential to a working electrode relative to a reference electrode. This potential drives an oxidation or reduction reaction of an electroactive species at the electrode surface. The resulting current is directly proportional to the concentration of the target analyte.
  - Three-Electrode Configuration: This is the traditional laboratory standard. It utilizes a Working Electrode (where the specific bio-reaction occurs), a Reference Electrode (which maintains a stable, known potential), and a Counter/Auxiliary Electrode (which carries the current so that no significant current passes through the reference electrode, preserving its stability).
  - Two-Electrode Configuration: While three-electrode setups offer superior potential control, two-electrode amperometric sensors are highly successful, robust, and dominant in commercial point-of-care devices (such as digital glucose meters). By modern microfabrication and screen-printing on plastic substrates, the counter and reference functions are combined into a single, high-surface-area pseudo-reference electrode. This drastically simplifies manufacturing while maintaining excellent precision for small-volume samples.Impedimetric Biosensors
  - (Electrochemical Impedance Spectroscopy - EIS): EIS sensors apply a small, alternating current (AC) voltage over a range of frequencies and measure the system's resistance to current flow (impedance). These sensors are highly sensitive to physical and chemical changes occurring at the sensor interface—such as molecular binding events that block ion transport.
  - Advanced designs leverage specialized geometries like interdigitated electrodes (IDEs) to maximize surface contact, or incorporate four-electrode electrochemical cells paired with nanoporous membranes (e.g., alumina) to detect incredibly low concentrations of target proteins (like human alpha-thrombin) even within dense, complex backgrounds like serum albumin.
- Field-Effect Transistor (FET) Biosensors: FET-based biosensors operate via direct electrical detection. Biological recognition elements are immobilized onto the gate region of a transistor. When the target analyte binds to the gate, its intrinsic electrical charge modifies the electric field across the semiconductor channel, altering the drain-source current. This enables label-free, ultra-sensitive detection of small peptides, DNA, and proteins. A subset of this technology includes Biofunctionalized Ion-Sensitive Field-Effect Transistors (BioFETs/ISFETs), which are highly sensitive to space-charge variations at the interface.

==== B. Passive Measurement Techniques ====
- Potentiometric Biosensors: These sensors measure the electrical potential difference between a working electrode and a reference electrode under conditions of zero current. Because the system remains at equilibrium, the generated voltage is space-charge sensitive and exhibits a logarithmic response relative to the analyte concentration (governed by the Nernst equation). This allows potentiometric sensors to feature an exceptionally wide dynamic range. They are frequently manufactured by screen-printing electrode patterns onto flexible plastic substrates, which are coated with a conducting polymer layer. Variations in ionic strength, pH, hydration, or localized redox reactions at the surface alter the charge distribution of the conducting polymer, yielding a highly robust, low-cost sensor requiring minimal sample preparation.

== 2. Classification by Biorecognition Mechanism ==
Regardless of the electrical technique used to read out the signal, the specificity of the biosensor depends entirely on its biological layer.

- Enzymatic Biosensors: These rely on the catalytic properties of specific enzymes. Most commonly, redox enzymes are utilized to directly or indirectly consume or produce electrons via the enzymatic turnover of a substrate. For example, the enzyme can produce an electroactive byproduct (like hydrogen peroxide) which is then oxidized at an amperometric working electrode to generate a current.
- Affinity-Based Biosensors (Immunosensors and Aptasensors): Instead of processing a chemical reaction, these sensors rely on the purely physical, high-affinity binding between a receptor and a target molecule.
  - Antibodies (Immunosensors): Utilize the highly specific lock-and-key binding of an antibody to its antigen. The binding event typically triggers a change in surface impedance or shifts the baseline current/voltage via an attached enzyme label.
  - Aptamers (Aptasensors): Utilize engineered, single-stranded oligonucleotides (DNA or RNA) that fold into unique 3D architectures to bind specific targets. Aptamers offer distinct advantages over antibodies, including superior thermal stability, lower production costs, and easier chemical modification for seamless integration onto conducting polymer layers.

By combining an optimized measurement technique (such as a simplified two-electrode amperometric system or a logarithmic potentiometric layout) with an appropriate biorecognition element, modern electrochemical biosensors can achieve the analytical sensitivity previously only possible with rigorous, laboratory-bound techniques like HPLC and LC/MS, all while maintaining a portable, zero-sample-preparation workflow.

=== Ion channel switch ===
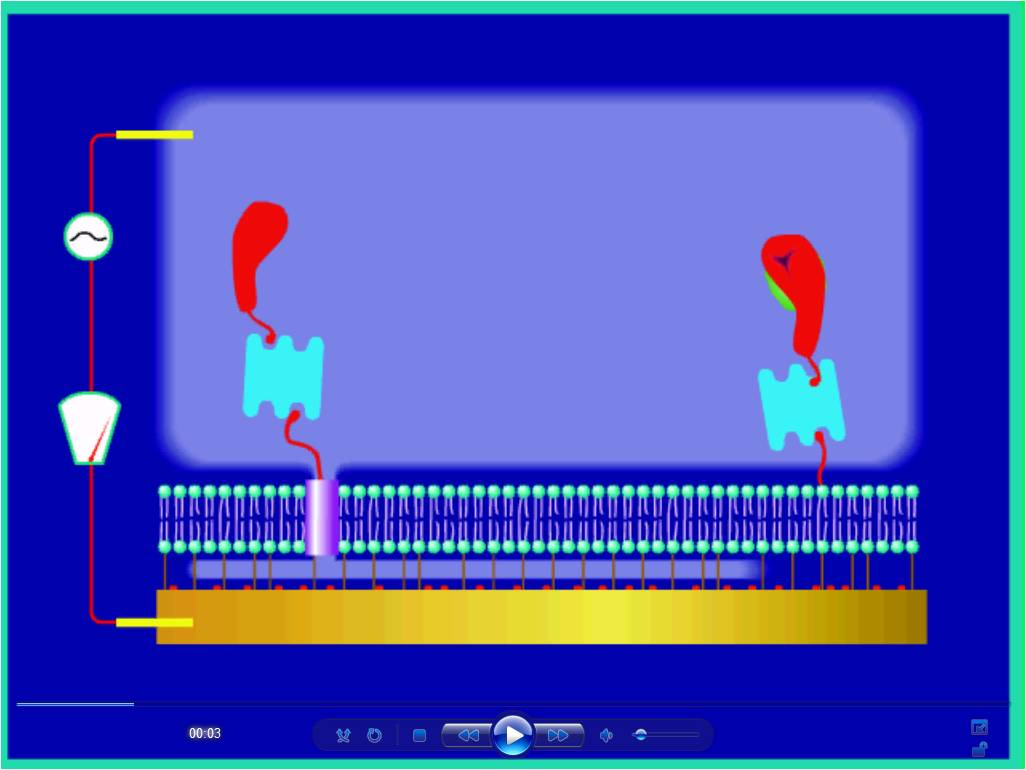
ICS – channel open

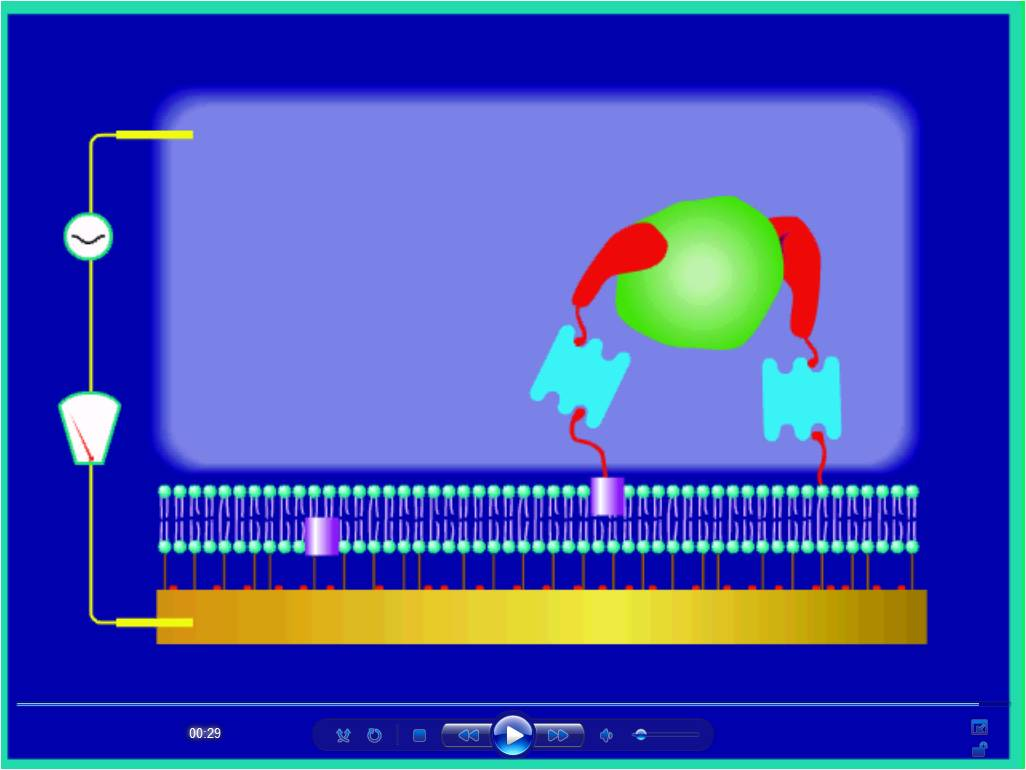
ICS – channel closed

The use of ion channels has been shown to offer highly sensitive detection of target biological molecules. By embedding the ion channels in supported or tethered bilayer membranes (t-BLM) attached to a gold electrode, an electrical circuit is created. Capture molecules such as antibodies can be bound to the ion channel so that the binding of the target molecule controls the ion flow through the channel. This results in a measurable change in the electrical conduction which is proportional to the concentration of the target.

An ion channel switch (ICS) biosensor can be created using gramicidin, a dimeric peptide channel, in a tethered bilayer membrane. One peptide of gramicidin, with attached antibody, is mobile and one is fixed. Breaking the dimer stops the ionic current through the membrane. The magnitude of the change in electrical signal is greatly increased by separating the membrane from the metal surface using a hydrophilic spacer.

Quantitative detection of an extensive class of target species, including proteins, bacteria, drug and toxins has been demonstrated using different membrane and capture configurations. The European research project Greensense develops a biosensor to perform quantitative screening of drug-of-abuse such as THC, morphine, and cocaine in saliva and urine.

=== Reagentless fluorescent biosensor ===
A reagentless biosensor can monitor a target analyte in a complex biological mixture without additional reagent. Therefore, it can function continuously if immobilized on a solid support. A fluorescent biosensor reacts to the interaction with its target analyte by a change of its fluorescence properties. A Reagentless Fluorescent biosensor (RF biosensor) can be obtained by integrating a biological receptor, which is directed against the target analyte, and a solvatochromic fluorophore, whose emission properties are sensitive to the nature of its local environment, in a single macromolecule. The fluorophore transduces the recognition event into a measurable optical signal. The use of extrinsic fluorophores, whose emission properties differ widely from those of the intrinsic fluorophores of proteins, tryptophan and tyrosine, enables one to immediately detect and quantify the analyte in complex biological mixtures. The integration of the fluorophore must be done in a site where it is sensitive to the binding of the analyte without perturbing the affinity of the receptor.

Antibodies and artificial families of Antigen Binding Proteins (AgBP) are well suited to provide the recognition module of RF biosensors since they can be directed against any antigen (see the paragraph on bioreceptors). A general approach to integrate a solvatochromic fluorophore in an AgBP when the atomic structure of the complex with its antigen is known, and thus transform it into a RF biosensor, has been described. A residue of the AgBP is identified in the neighborhood of the antigen in their complex. This residue is changed into a cysteine by site-directed mutagenesis. The fluorophore is chemically coupled to the mutant cysteine. When the design is successful, the coupled fluorophore does not prevent the binding of the antigen, this binding shields the fluorophore from the solvent, and it can be detected by a change of fluorescence. This strategy is also valid for antibody fragments.

However, in the absence of specific structural data, other strategies must be applied. Antibodies and artificial families of AgBPs are constituted by a set of hypervariable (or randomized) residue positions, located in a unique sub-region of the protein, and supported by a constant polypeptide scaffold. The residues that form the binding site for a given antigen, are selected among the hypervariable residues. It is possible to transform any AgBP of these families into a RF biosensor, specific of the target antigen, simply by coupling a solvatochromic fluorophore to one of the hypervariable residues that have little or no importance for the interaction with the antigen, after changing this residue into cysteine by mutagenesis. More specifically, the strategy consists in individually changing the residues of the hypervariable positions into cysteine at the genetic level, in chemically coupling a solvatochromic fluorophore with the mutant cysteine, and then in keeping the resulting conjugates that have the highest sensitivity (a parameter that involves both affinity and variation of fluorescence signal). This approach is also valid for families of antibody fragments.

A posteriori studies have shown that the best reagentless fluorescent biosensors are obtained when the fluorophore does not make non-covalent interactions with the surface of the bioreceptor, which would increase the background signal, and when it interacts with a binding pocket at the surface of the target antigen. The RF biosensors that are obtained by the above methods, can function and detect target analytes inside living cells.

=== Magnetic biosensors ===
Magnetic biosensors utilize paramagnetic or supra-paramagnetic particles, or crystals, to detect biological interactions. Examples could be coil-inductance, resistance, or other magnetic properties. It is common to use magnetic nano or microparticles. In the surface of such particles are the bioreceptors, that can be DNA (complementary to a sequence or aptamers) antibodies, or others. The binding of the bioreceptor will affect some of the magnetic particle properties that can be measured by AC susceptometry, a Hall Effect sensor, a giant magnetoresistance device, or others.

=== Others ===
Piezoelectric sensors utilise crystals which undergo an elastic deformation when an electrical potential is applied to them. An alternating potential (A.C.) produces a standing wave in the crystal at a characteristic frequency. This frequency is highly dependent on the elastic properties of the crystal, such that if a crystal is coated with a biological recognition element the binding of a (large) target analyte to a receptor will produce a change in the resonance frequency, which gives a binding signal. In a mode that uses surface acoustic waves (SAW), the sensitivity is greatly increased. This is a specialised application of the quartz crystal microbalance as a biosensor

Electrochemiluminescence (ECL) is nowadays a leading technique in biosensors. Since the excited species are produced with an electrochemical stimulus rather than with a light excitation source, ECL displays improved signal-to-noise ratio compared to photoluminescence, with minimized effects due to light scattering and luminescence background. In particular, coreactant ECL operating in buffered aqueous solution in the region of positive potentials (oxidative-reduction mechanism) definitively boosted ECL for immunoassay, as confirmed by many research applications and, even more, by the presence of important companies which developed commercial hardware for high throughput immunoassays analysis in a market worth billions of dollars each year.

Thermometric biosensors are rare.

== Biosensor MOSFET (BioFET) ==
The MOSFET invented at Bell Labs between 1955 and 1960, Later, Leland C. Clark and Champ Lyons invented the first biosensor in 1962. Biosensor MOSFETs (BioFETs) were later developed, and they have since been widely used to measure physical, chemical, biological and environmental parameters.

The first BioFET was the ion-sensitive field-effect transistor (ISFET), invented by Piet Bergveld for electrochemical and biological applications in 1970. the adsorption FET (ADFET) was patented by P.F. Cox in 1974, and a hydrogen-sensitive MOSFET was demonstrated by I. Lundstrom, M.S. Shivaraman, C.S. Svenson and L. Lundkvist in 1975. The ISFET is a special type of MOSFET with a gate at a certain distance, and where the metal gate is replaced by an ion-sensitive membrane, electrolyte solution and reference electrode. The ISFET is widely used in biomedical applications, such as the detection of DNA hybridization, biomarker detection from blood, antibody detection, glucose measurement, pH sensing, and genetic technology.

By the mid-1980s, other BioFETs had been developed, including the gas sensor FET (GASFET), pressure sensor FET (PRESSFET), chemical field-effect transistor (ChemFET), reference ISFET (REFET), enzyme-modified FET (ENFET) and immunologically modified FET (IMFET). By the early 2000s, BioFETs such as the DNA field-effect transistor (DNAFET), gene-modified FET (GenFET) and cell-potential BioFET (CPFET) had been developed.

== Placement of biosensors ==
The appropriate placement of biosensors depends on their field of application, which may roughly be divided into biotechnology, agriculture, food technology and biomedicine.

In biotechnology, analysis of the chemical composition of cultivation broth can be conducted in-line, on-line, at-line and off-line. As outlined by the US Food and Drug Administration (FDA) the sample is not removed from the process stream for in-line sensors, while it is diverted from the manufacturing process for on-line measurements. For at-line sensors the sample may be removed and analyzed in close proximity to the process stream. An example of the latter is the monitoring of lactose in a dairy processing plant. Off-line biosensors compare to bioanalytical techniques that are not operating in the field, but in the laboratory. These techniques are mainly used in agriculture, food technology and biomedicine.

In medical applications biosensors are generally categorized as in vitro and in vivo systems. An in vitro, biosensor measurement takes place in a test tube, a culture dish, a microtiter plate or elsewhere outside a living organism. The sensor uses a bioreceptor and transducer as outlined above. An example of an in vitro biosensor is an enzyme-conductimetric biosensor for blood glucose monitoring. There is a challenge to create a biosensor that operates by the principle of point-of-care testing, i.e. at the location where the test is needed. Development of wearable biosensors is among such studies. The elimination of lab testing can save time and money. An application of a POCT biosensor can be for the testing of HIV in areas where it is difficult for patients to be tested. A biosensor can be sent directly to the location and a quick and easy test can be used.

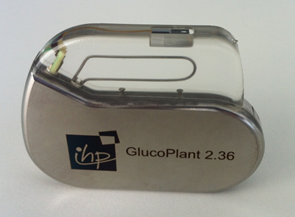
Biosensor implant for glucose monitoring in subcutaneous tissue (59x45x8 mm). Electronic components are hermetically enclosed in a Ti casing, while antenna and sensor probe are moulded into the epoxy header.

An in vivo biosensor is an implantable device that operates inside the body. Of course, biosensor implants have to fulfill the strict regulations on sterilization in order to avoid an initial inflammatory response after implantation. The second concern relates to the long-term biocompatibility, i.e. the unharmful interaction with the body environment during the intended period of use. Another issue that arises is failure. If there is failure, the device must be removed and replaced, causing additional surgery. An example for application of an in vivo biosensor would be the insulin monitoring within the body, which is not available yet.

Most advanced biosensor implants have been developed for the continuous monitoring of glucose. The figure displays a device, for which a Ti casing and a battery as established for cardiovascular implants like pacemakers and defibrillators is used. Its size is determined by the battery as required for a lifetime of one year. Measured glucose data will be transmitted wirelessly out of the body within the MICS 402-405 MHz band as approved for medical implants.

Biosensors can also be integrated into mobile phone systems, making them user-friendly and accessible to a large number of users.

== Applications ==
Biosensing of influenza virus using an antibody-modified boron-doped diamond

There are many potential applications of biosensors of various types. The main requirements for a biosensor approach to be valuable in terms of research and commercial applications are the identification of a target molecule, availability of a suitable biological recognition element, and the potential for disposable portable detection systems to be preferred to sensitive laboratory-based techniques in some situations. Some examples are:

- glucose monitoring in diabetes patients, other medical health related targets,
- environmental applications, e.g. the detection of pesticides, detection and determining of organophosphate, and river water contaminants, such as heavy metal ions,
- remote sensing of airborne bacteria, e.g. in counter-bioterrorist activities,
- remote sensing of water quality in coastal waters by describing online different aspects of clam ethology (biological rhythms, growth rates, spawning or death records) in groups of abandoned bivalves around the world,
- detection of pathogens,
- determining levels of toxic substances before and after bioremediation,
- routine analytical measurement of folic acid, biotin, vitamin B12 and pantothenic acid as an alternative to microbiological assay,
- characterization of biomolecular binding kinetics and thermodynamics, including antibody–lipoprotein interactions,
- determination of drug residues in food, such as antibiotics and growth promoters, particularly meat and honey,
- drug discovery and evaluation of biological activity of new compounds,
- protein engineering in biosensors, and
- detection of toxic metabolites such as mycotoxins or cyanotoxins.

A common example of a commercial biosensor is the blood glucose biosensor, which uses the enzyme glucose oxidase to break blood glucose down. In doing so it first oxidizes glucose and uses two electrons to reduce the FAD (a component of the enzyme) to FADH_{2}. This in turn is oxidized by the electrode in a number of steps. The resulting current is a measure of the concentration of glucose. In this case, the electrode is the transducer and the enzyme is the biologically active component.

A canary in a cage, as used by miners to warn of gas, could be considered a biosensor. Many of today's biosensor applications are similar, in that they use organisms which respond to toxic substances at a much lower concentrations than humans can detect to warn of their presence. Such devices can be used in environmental monitoring, trace gas detection and in water treatment facilities.

=== Glucose monitoring ===
Commercially available glucose monitors rely on amperometric sensing of glucose by means of glucose oxidase, which oxidises glucose producing hydrogen peroxide which is detected by the electrode. To overcome the limitation of amperometric sensors, a flurry of research is present into novel sensing methods, such as fluorescent glucose biosensors.

=== Interferometric reflectance imaging sensor ===
The interferometric reflectance imaging sensor (IRIS) is based on the principles of optical interference and consists of a silicon-silicon oxide substrate, standard optics, and low-powered coherent LEDs. When light is illuminated through a low magnification objective onto the layered silicon-silicon oxide substrate, an interferometric signature is produced. As biomass, which has a similar index of refraction as silicon oxide, accumulates on the substrate surface, a change in the interferometric signature occurs and the change can be correlated to a quantifiable mass. Daaboul et al. used IRIS to yield a label-free sensitivity of approximately 19 ng/mL. Ahn et al. improved the sensitivity of IRIS through a mass tagging technique.

Since initial publication, IRIS has been adapted to perform various functions. First, IRIS integrated a fluorescence imaging capability into the interferometric imaging instrument as a potential way to address fluorescence protein microarray variability. Briefly, the variation in fluorescence microarrays mainly derives from inconsistent protein immobilization on surfaces and may cause misdiagnoses in allergy microarrays. To correct for any variation in protein immobilization, data acquired in the fluorescence modality is then normalized by the data acquired in the label-free modality. IRIS has also been adapted to perform single nanoparticle counting by simply switching the low magnification objective used for label-free biomass quantification to a higher objective magnification. This modality enables size discrimination in complex human biological samples. Monroe et al. used IRIS to quantify protein levels spiked into human whole blood and serum and determined allergen sensitization in characterized human blood samples using zero sample processing. Other practical uses of this device include virus and pathogen detection.

=== Food analysis ===
There are several applications of biosensors in food analysis. In the food industry, optics coated with antibodies are commonly used to detect pathogens and food toxins. Commonly, the light system in these biosensors is fluorescence, since this type of optical measurement can greatly amplify the signal.

A range of immuno- and ligand-binding assays for the detection and measurement of small molecules such as water-soluble vitamins and chemical contaminants (drug residues) such as sulfonamides and Beta-agonists have been developed for use on SPR based sensor systems, often adapted from existing ELISA or other immunological assay. These are in widespread use across the food industry.

=== Detection/monitoring of pollutants ===
Biosensors could be used to monitor air, water, and soil pollutants such as pesticides, potentially carcinogenic, mutagenic, and/or toxic substances and endocrine disrupting chemicals.

For example, bionanotechnologists developed a viable biosensor, ROSALIND 2.0, that can detect levels of diverse water pollutants.

=== Ozone measurement ===
Because ozone filters out harmful ultraviolet radiation, the discovery of holes in the ozone layer of the earth's atmosphere has raised concern about how much ultraviolet light reaches the earth's surface. Of particular concern are the questions of how deeply into sea water ultraviolet radiation penetrates and how it affects marine organisms, especially plankton (floating microorganisms) and viruses that attack plankton. Plankton form the base of the marine food chains and are believed to affect our planet's temperature and weather by uptake of CO_{2} for photosynthesis.

Deneb Karentz, a researcher at the Laboratory of Radio-biology and Environmental Health (University of California, San Francisco) has devised a simple method for measuring ultraviolet penetration and intensity. Working in the Antarctic Ocean, she submerged to various depths thin plastic bags containing special strains of E. coli that are almost totally unable to repair ultraviolet radiation damage to their DNA. Bacterial death rates in these bags were compared with rates in unexposed control bags of the same organism. The bacterial "biosensors" revealed constant significant ultraviolet damage at depths of 10 m and frequently at 20 and 30 m. Karentz plans additional studies of how ultraviolet may affect seasonal plankton blooms (growth spurts) in the oceans.

=== Metastatic cancer cell detection ===
Metastasis is the spread of cancer from one part of the body to another via either the circulatory system or lymphatic system. Unlike radiology imaging tests (mammograms), which send forms of energy (x-rays, magnetic fields, etc.) through the body to only take interior pictures, biosensors have the potential to directly test the malignant power of the tumor. The combination of a biological and detector element allows for a small sample requirement, a compact design, rapid signals, rapid detection, high selectivity and high sensitivity for the analyte being studied. Compared to the usual radiology imaging tests, biosensors have the advantage of not only finding out how far cancer has spread and checking if treatment is effective but also are cheaper, more efficient (in time, cost and productivity) ways to assess metastaticity in early stages of cancer.

Biological engineering researchers have created oncological biosensors for breast cancer. Breast cancer is the leading common cancer among women worldwide. An example would be a transferrin- quartz crystal microbalance (QCM). As a biosensor, quartz crystal microbalances produce oscillations in the frequency of the crystal's standing wave from an alternating potential to detect nano-gram mass changes. These biosensors are specifically designed to interact and have high selectivity for receptors on cell (cancerous and normal) surfaces. Ideally, this provides a quantitative detection of cells with this receptor per surface area instead of a qualitative picture detection given by mammograms.

Seda Atay, a biotechnology researcher at Hacettepe University, experimentally observed this specificity and selectivity between a QCM and MDA-MB 231 breast cells, MCF 7 cells, and starved MDA-MB 231 cells in vitro. With other researchers she devised a method of washing these different metastatic leveled cells over the sensors to measure mass shifts due to different quantities of transferrin receptors. Particularly, the metastatic power of breast cancer cells can be determined by Quartz crystal microbalances with nanoparticles and transferrin that would potentially attach to transferrin receptors on cancer cell surfaces. There is very high selectivity for transferrin receptors because they are over-expressed in cancer cells. If cells have high expression of transferrin receptors, which shows their high metastatic power, they have higher affinity and bind more to the QCM that measures the increase in mass. Depending on the magnitude of the nano-gram mass change, the metastatic power can be determined.

Additionally, in the last years, significant attentions have been focused to detect the biomarkers of lung cancer without biopsy. In this regard, biosensors are very attractive and applicable tools for providing rapid, sensitive, specific, stable, cost-effective and non-invasive detections for early lung cancer diagnosis. Thus, cancer biosensors consisting of specific biorecognition molecules such as antibodies, complementary nucleic acid probes or other immobilized biomolecules on a transducer surface. The biorecognition molecules interact specifically with the biomarkers (targets) and the generated biological responses are converted by the transducer into a measurable analytical signal. Depending on the type of biological response, various transducers are utilized in the fabrication of cancer biosensors such as electrochemical, optical and mass-based transducers.

=== Pathogen detection ===
Biosensors could be used for the detection of pathogenic organisms.

Embedded biosensors for pathogenic signatures – such as of SARS-CoV-2 – that are wearable have been developed – such as face masks with built-in tests. See also: COVID-19 public transport R&D

New types of biosensor-chips could enable novel methods "such as drone-deployed pathogen sensors actively surveying air or wastewater". Protein-binding aptamers could be used for testing for infectious disease pathogens. Systems of electronic skins (or robot skins) with built-in biosensors (or chemical sensors) and human-machine interfaces may enable wearable as well as remote sensed device- or robotic-sensing of pathogens (as well as of several hazardous materials and tactile perceptions).

== Types ==
=== Optical biosensors ===
Many optical biosensors are based on the phenomenon of surface plasmon resonance (SPR) techniques. This utilises a property of gold and other materials (metals); specifically that a thin layer of gold on a high refractive index glass surface can absorb laser light, producing electron waves (surface plasmons) on the gold surface. This occurs only at a specific angle and wavelength of incident light and is highly dependent on the surface of the gold, such that binding of a target analyte to a receptor on the gold surface produces a measurable signal.

Surface plasmon resonance sensors operate using a sensor chip consisting of a plastic cassette supporting a glass plate, one side of which is coated with a microscopic layer of gold. This side contacts the optical detection apparatus of the instrument. The opposite side is then contacted with a microfluidic flow system. The contact with the flow system creates channels across which reagents can be passed in solution. This side of the glass sensor chip can be modified in a number of ways, to allow easy attachment of molecules of interest. Normally it is coated in carboxymethyl dextran or similar compound.

The refractive index at the flow side of the chip surface has a direct influence on the behavior of the light reflected off the gold side. Binding to the flow side of the chip has an effect on the refractive index and in this way biological interactions can be measured to a high degree of sensitivity with some sort of energy. The refractive index of the medium near the surface changes when biomolecules attach to the surface, and the SPR angle varies as a function of this change.

Light of a fixed wavelength is reflected off the gold side of the chip at the angle of total internal reflection, and detected inside the instrument. The angle of incident light is varied in order to match the evanescent wave propagation rate with the propagation rate of the surface plasmon polaritons. This induces the evanescent wave to penetrate through the glass plate and some distance into the liquid flowing over the surface.

Other optical biosensors are mainly based on changes in absorbance or fluorescence of an appropriate indicator compound and do not need a total internal reflection geometry. For example, a fully operational prototype device detecting casein in milk has been fabricated. The device is based on detecting changes in absorption of a gold layer. A widely used research tool, the micro-array, can also be considered a biosensor.

Surface Plasmon Resonance (SPR) Immunosensors: Real-time, label-free optical biosensors that track antibody-antigen binding kinetics for trace explosives like TNT.

=== Biological biosensors ===
Biological biosensors, also known as optogenetic sensors, often incorporate a genetically modified form of a native protein or enzyme. The protein is configured to detect a specific analyte and the ensuing signal is read by a detection instrument such as a fluorometer or luminometer. An example of a recently developed biosensor is one for detecting cytosolic concentration of the analyte cAMP (cyclic adenosine monophosphate), a second messenger involved in cellular signaling triggered by ligands interacting with receptors on the cell membrane. Similar systems have been created to study cellular responses to native ligands or xenobiotics (toxins or small molecule inhibitors). Such "assays" are commonly used in drug discovery development by pharmaceutical and biotechnology companies. Most cAMP assays in current use require lysis of the cells prior to measurement of cAMP. A live-cell biosensor for cAMP can be used in non-lysed cells with the additional advantage of multiple reads to study the kinetics of receptor response.

Nanobiosensors use an immobilized bioreceptor probe that is selective for target molecules. Nanomaterials are sensitive chemical and biological sensors. Nanoscale materials demonstrate unique properties. Their large surface area to volume ratio can achieve rapid and low cost reactions, using a variety of designs.

Other evanescent wave biosensors have been commercialised using waveguides where the propagation constant through the waveguide is changed by the absorption of molecules to the waveguide surface. One such example, dual polarisation interferometry uses a buried waveguide as a reference against which the change in propagation constant is measured. Other configurations such as the Mach–Zehnder have reference arms lithographically defined on a substrate. Higher levels of integration can be achieved using resonator geometries where the resonant frequency of a ring resonator changes when molecules are absorbed.

=== Electronic nose devices ===
Recently, arrays of many different detector molecules have been applied in so called electronic nose devices, where the pattern of response from the detectors is used to fingerprint a substance. In the Wasp Hound odor-detector, the mechanical element is a video camera and the biological element is five parasitic wasps who have been conditioned to swarm in response to the presence of a specific chemical. Current commercial electronic noses, however, do not use biological elements.

=== DNA biosensors ===
DNA can be the analyte of a biosensor, being detected through specific means, but it can also be used as part of a biosensor or, theoretically, even as a whole biosensor.

Many techniques exist to detect DNA, which is usually a means to detect organisms that have that particular DNA. DNA sequences can also be used as described above. But more forward-looking approaches exist, where DNA can be synthesized to hold enzymes in a biological, stable gel. Other applications are the design of aptamers, sequences of DNA that have a specific shape to bind a desired molecule. The most innovative processes use DNA origami for this, creating sequences that fold in a predictable structure that is useful for detection.

Scientists have built prototype sensors to detect DNA of animals from sucked in air, "airborne eDNA".

"Nanoantennas" made out of DNA – a novel type of nano-scale optical antenna – can be attached to proteins and produce a signal via fluorescence when these perform their biological functions, in particular for distinct conformational changes.

=== Graphene-based biosensor ===
Graphene is a two-dimensional carbon-based substance with superior optical, electrical, mechanical, thermal, and mechanical properties. The ability to absorb and immobilize a variety of proteins, particularly some with carbon ring structures, has proven graphene to be an excellent candidate as a biosensor transducer. As a result, various graphene-based biosensors have been explored and developed in recent times. Graphene has been employed as a biosensor in various formats especially electrochemical sensors and field effect transistors. Amongst them graphene field effect transistors (GFETs) especially have shown excellent performance as rapid point of care (PoC) diagnostics as observed through a surge in number of research articles reporting COVID-19 diagnostics using GFETs. They have been reported to have some of the lowest limit of detection whilst also having a rapid turn around time of a few seconds along with multiplexing abilities. These capabilities allow for immediate disease detection especially in cases with overlapping symptoms which are hard to distinguish at the outset, thus allowing for better patient outcomes especially in resource strained medical settings.

== See also ==
- Bioactive paper
- Bioelectronics
- Biointerface
- Biomarker
- DNA field-effect transistor
- Dual-polarization interferometry
- Electro-switchable biosurfaces
- Electrochemiluminescence
- Impedance microbiology
- Lanthanide probes
- Magnotech
- Microphysiometry
- Multi-parametric surface plasmon resonance
- Nanobiotechnology
- Optogenetic methods to record cellular activity
- Plasmon
- Signs of LIfe Detector
- Small molecule sensors
- Surface plasmon resonance
- Bio-FET
- Nanopore
- Viking lander biological experiments

== Bibliography ==
- Frieder Scheller & Florian Schubert (1989). Biosensoren. Akademie-Verlag, Berlin. ISBN 978-3-05-500659-3.
- Massimo Grattarola & Giuseppe Massobrio (1998). Bioelectronics Handbook - MOSFETs, Biosensors and Neurons. McGraw-Hill, New York. ISBN 978-0-07-003174-6.

== See also ==
- Immunoassay
- Signs of LIfe Detector
- Viking lander biological experiments
