= C9H21N =

The molecular formula C_{9}H_{21}N (molar mass: 143.27 g/mol) may refer to:

- Triisopropylamine
- Tripropylamine
