= Botulism =

Human and animal disease

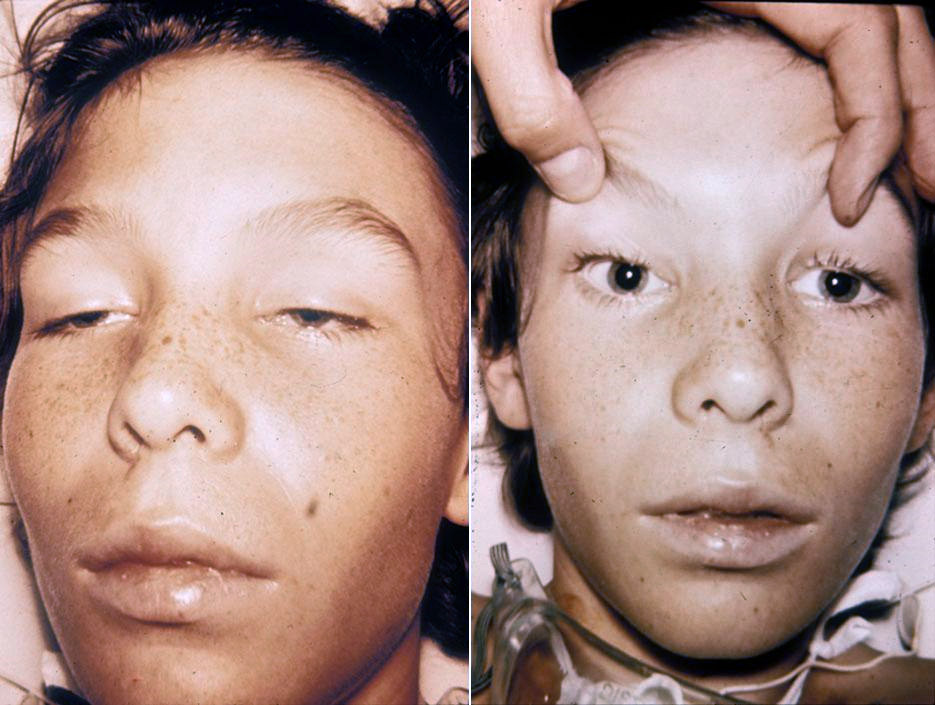
- image of a child with botulism
- Pronunciation: /ˈbɒtjʊlɪzəm/
- Specialty: Infectious disease, gastroenterology
- Symptoms: Weakness, trouble seeing, feeling tired, trouble speaking
- Complications: Respiratory failure
- Usual onset: 12 to 72 hours
- Duration: Variable
- Types: Foodborne, wound, infant, adult intestinal toxemia, inhalational, iatrogenic
- Causes: Clostridium botulinum
- Risk factors: Improperly canned, preserved or fermented foods; injection drug use (e.g. black-tar heroin); honey consumption in infants <1 year; contaminated wounds; high-dose cosmetic/therapeutic botulinum-toxin injections
- Diagnostic method: Finding the bacteria or their toxin
- Differential diagnosis: Myasthenia gravis, Guillain–Barré syndrome, Amyotrophic lateral sclerosis, Lambert Eaton syndrome
- Prevention: Proper food preparation, no honey for children younger than one
- Treatment: Antitoxin, antibiotics, mechanical ventilation
- Prognosis: ~7.5% risk of death
- Frequency: Worldwide: c. 1000 reported cases per year; United States: 273 cases in 2021
- Deaths: Global case-fatality rate 5–10 % (≈50–100 deaths annually)

Botulism is a rare and potentially fatal illness caused by botulinum toxin (commonly referred to as botox), which is produced by the bacterium Clostridium botulinum. The disease begins with weakness, blurred vision, fatigue, and trouble speaking. This may then be followed by weakness of the arms, chest muscles, and legs. Vomiting, swelling of the abdomen, and diarrhea may also occur. The disease does not usually affect consciousness or cause a fever.

Botulism can occur in several ways. The bacterial spores that cause it are common in both soil and water and are very resistant. They produce the botulinum toxin when exposed to low oxygen levels and certain temperatures. Foodborne botulism happens when food containing the toxin is eaten. Infant botulism instead happens when the bacterium develops in the intestines and releases the toxin. This typically only occurs in children less than one year old, as protective mechanisms against development of the bacterium develop after that age. Wound botulism is found most often among those who inject street drugs. In this situation, spores enter a wound and, in the absence of oxygen, release the toxin. The disease is not passed directly between people. Its diagnosis is confirmed by finding the toxin or bacteria in the person in question.

Prevention is primarily by proper food preparation. The toxin, though not the spores, is destroyed by heating it to more than 85 °C (185 °F) for longer than five minutes. The clostridial spores can be destroyed in an autoclave with moist heat (120°C/ 250°F for at least 15 minutes) or dry heat (160°C/ 320°F for 2 hours) or by irradiation. The spores of group I strains are inactivated by heating at 121°C (250°F) for 3 minutes during commercial canning. Spores of group II strains are less heat-resistant, and they are often damaged by 90°C (194°F) for 10 minutes, 85°C for 52 minutes, or 80°C for 270 minutes; however, these treatments may not be sufficient in some foods. Honey can contain the organism. For this reason, honey should not be fed to children under 12 months. Treatment is with an antitoxin. In those who lose their ability to breathe on their own, mechanical ventilation may be necessary for months. Antibiotics may be used for wound botulism. Death occurs in 5 to 10% of people. Botulism also affects many other animals. The word is from Latin botulus, meaning 'sausage'.

== Signs and symptoms ==
The muscle weakness of botulism characteristically starts in the muscles supplied by the cranial nerves—a group of twelve nerves that control eye movements, the facial muscles, and the muscles controlling chewing and swallowing. Double vision, drooping of both eyelids, loss of facial expression and swallowing problems may therefore occur. In addition to affecting the voluntary muscles, it can also cause disruptions in the autonomic nervous system. This is experienced as a dry mouth and throat (due to decreased production of saliva), postural hypotension (decreased blood pressure on standing, with resultant lightheadedness and risk of blackouts), and eventually constipation (due to decreased forward movement of intestinal contents). Some of the toxins (B and E) also precipitate nausea, vomiting, and difficulty with talking. The weakness then spreads to the arms (starting in the shoulders and proceeding to the forearms) and legs (again from the thighs down to the feet).

Severe botulism leads to reduced movement of the muscles of respiration, and hence problems with gas exchange. This may be experienced as dyspnea (difficulty breathing), but when severe can lead to respiratory failure due to the buildup of unexhaled carbon dioxide and its resultant depressant effect on the brain. This may lead to respiratory compromise and death if untreated.

Clinicians frequently think of the symptoms of botulism in terms of a classic triad: bulbar palsy and descending paralysis, lack of fever, and clear senses and mental status ("clear sensorium").

=== Infant botulism ===
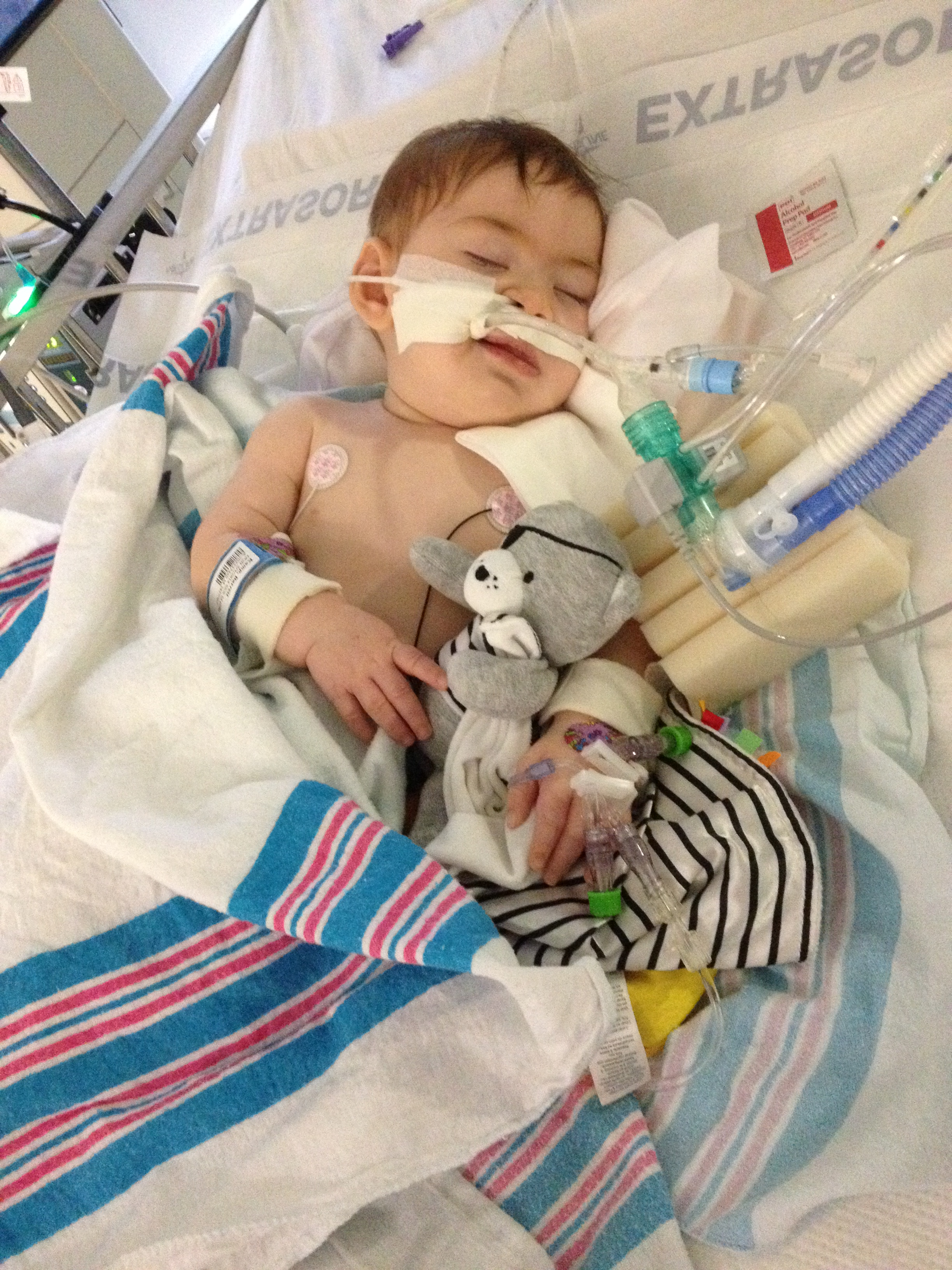
An infant with botulism. Despite not being asleep or sedated, he cannot open his eyes or move; he also has a weak cry.

Infant botulism (also referred to as floppy baby syndrome) was first recognized in 1976 and is the most common form of botulism in the United States. Infants are susceptible to infant botulism in the first year of life, with more than 90% of cases occurring in infants younger than six months. Infant botulism results from the ingestion of the C. botulinum spores, and subsequent colonization of the small intestine. The infant gut may be colonized when the composition of the intestinal microflora (normal flora) is insufficient to competitively inhibit the growth of C. botulinum and levels of bile acids (which normally inhibit clostridial growth) are lower than later in life.

The growth of the spores releases botulinum toxin, which is then absorbed into the bloodstream and taken throughout the body, causing paralysis by blocking the release of acetylcholine at the neuromuscular junction. Typical symptoms of infant botulism include constipation, lethargy, weakness, difficulty feeding, and an altered cry, often progressing to a complete descending flaccid paralysis. Although constipation is usually the first symptom of infant botulism, it is commonly overlooked.

Honey is a known dietary reservoir of C. botulinum spores and has been linked to infant botulism. For this reason, honey is not recommended for infants less than one year of age. Most cases of infant botulism, however, are thought to be caused by acquiring the spores from the natural environment. Clostridium botulinum is a ubiquitous soil-dwelling bacterium. Many infant botulism patients have been demonstrated to live near a construction site or an area of soil disturbance.

Infant botulism has been reported in 49 of 50 US states (all except for Rhode Island), and cases have been recognized in 26 countries on five continents.

=== Complications ===
When treated promptly, infant botulism is understood to have no long-term side effects.

Botulism can result in death due to respiratory failure. However, in the past 50 years, the proportion of patients with botulism who die has fallen from about 50% to 7% due to improved supportive care. A patient with severe botulism may require mechanical ventilation (breathing support through a ventilator) as well as intensive medical and nursing care, sometimes for several months. The person may require rehabilitation therapy after leaving the hospital. Many patients have ongoing fatigue and breathing problems, even after treatment.

== Cause ==
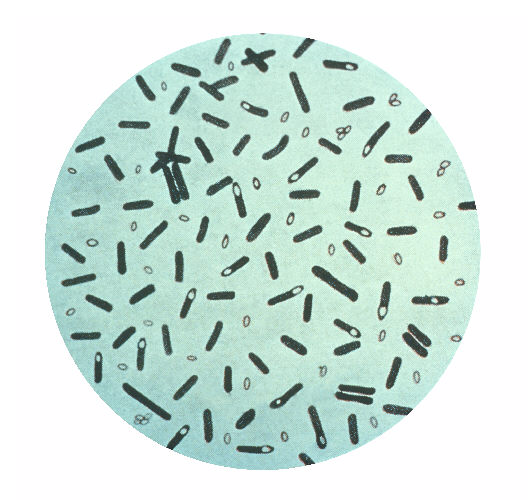
A photomicrograph of Clostridium botulinum bacteria.

Clostridium botulinum is an anaerobic, Gram-positive, spore-forming rod. Botulinum toxin is one of the most powerful known toxins: about one microgram is lethal to humans when inhaled. It acts by blocking nerve function (neuromuscular blockade) through inhibition of the excitatory neurotransmitter acetylcholine's release from the presynaptic membrane of neuromuscular junctions in the somatic nervous system. This causes paralysis. Advanced botulism can cause respiratory failure by paralysing the muscles of the chest; this can progress to respiratory arrest. Furthermore, acetylcholine release from the presynaptic membranes of muscarinic nerve synapses is blocked. This can lead to a variety of autonomic signs and symptoms described above.

In all cases, illness is caused by the botulinum toxin, which the bacterium C. botulinum produces in anaerobic conditions, and not by the bacterium itself. The pattern of damage occurs because the toxin affects nerves that fire (depolarize) at a higher frequency first.

Mechanisms of entry into the human body for botulinum toxin are described below.

=== Colonization of the gut ===
The most common form in Western countries is infant botulism. This occurs in infants who are colonized with the bacterium in the small intestine during the early stages of their lives. The bacterium then produces the toxin, which is absorbed into the bloodstream. The consumption of honey during the first year of life has been identified as a risk factor for infant botulism; it is a factor in a fifth of all cases. The adult form of infant botulism is termed adult intestinal toxemia, and is exceedingly rare.

=== Food ===
The most common cause of foodborne botulism is toxin produced by the bacterium in containers of food that have been improperly preserved. Fish that have been pickled without the salinity or acidity of brine that contains acetic acid and high sodium levels, as well as smoked fish stored at too high a temperature, present a risk, as does improperly canned food.

Food-borne botulism results from contaminated food in which C. botulinum spores have been allowed to germinate in low-oxygen conditions. This typically occurs in improperly prepared home-canned food substances and fermented dishes without adequate salt or acidity. Given that multiple people often consume food from the same source, it is common for more than a single person to be affected simultaneously. Symptoms usually appear 12–36 hours after eating, but can also appear within 6 hours to 10 days.

No withdrawal periods have been established for cows affected by botulism. Lactating cows injected with various doses of botulinum toxin C have not resulted in detectable botulinum neurotoxin in milk produced. Using mouse bioassays and immunostick ELISA tests, botulinum toxin was detected in whole blood and serum but not in milk samples, suggesting that botulinum type C toxin does not enter milk in detectable concentrations. Cooking and pasteurization denatures botulinum toxin but does not necessarily eliminate spores. Botulinum spores or toxins can find their way into the dairy production chain from the environment. Despite the low risk of milk and meat contamination, the protocol for fatal bovine botulism cases appears to be incineration of carcasses and withholding any potentially contaminated milk from human consumption. It is also advised that raw milk from affected cows should not be consumed by humans or fed to calves.

There have been several reports of botulism from pruno wine made from food scraps in prison. In a Mississippi prison in 2016, prisoners illegally brewed alcohol that led to 31 cases of botulism. The research study done on these cases found the symptoms of mild botulism matched the symptoms of severe botulism, though the outcomes and progression of the disease were different.

=== Wound ===
Wound botulism results from the contamination of a wound with the bacteria, which then secretes the toxin into the bloodstream. This has become more common in intravenous drug users since the 1990s, especially people using black tar heroin and those injecting heroin into the skin rather than the veins. Wound botulism can also come from a minor wound that is not properly cleaned out; the skin grows over the wound, thus trapping the spore in an anaerobic environment and creating botulism. One example was a person who cut their ankle while using a weed eater; as the wound healed over, it trapped a blade of grass and speck of soil under the skin that led to severe botulism requiring hospitalization and rehabilitation for months. Wound botulism accounts for 29% of cases.

=== Inhalation ===
Isolated cases of botulism have been described after inhalation by laboratory workers.

=== Injection (iatrogenic botulism) ===
Symptoms of botulism may occur away from the injection site of botulinum toxin. This may include muscle weakness, blurred vision, dysphagia, change of voice, or trouble breathing, which can result in death. Onset can be hours to weeks after an injection. This generally only occurs with inappropriate strengths of botulinum toxin for cosmetic use or due to the larger doses used to treat movement disorders. However, there are cases where medical and cosmetic botulinum toxin resulted in severe botulism and death. Following a 2008 review the FDA added these concerns as a boxed warning. . Various support group and websites exist to support those experiencing botulism symptoms after botulinum toxin injections, including ToxSafety.com and IatrogenicBotulism.com.

=== Lawsuits about botulism against pharmaceuticals ===
Before the boxed warning labels that included a disclaimer that botulinum toxin injections could cause botulism, there was a series of lawsuits against the pharmaceutical firms that manufactured injectable botulinum toxin. A Hollywood producer's wife brought a lawsuit after experiencing debilitating adverse events from migraine treatment. A lawsuit on behalf of a 3-year-old boy who was permanently disabled by a botulinum toxin injection was settled in court during the trial. The family of a 7-year-old boy treated with botulinum toxin injections for leg spasms sued after the boy almost died. Several families of people who died after treatments with botulinum toxin injections brought lawsuits. One lawsuit prevailed for the plaintiff who was awarded compensation of $15 million; the plaintiff was a physician who was diagnosed with botulism by thirteen neurologists at the NIH. Deposition video from that lawsuit quotes a pharmaceutical executive stating that "Botox doesn't cause botulism."

== Mechanism ==
The toxin is the protein botulinum toxin produced under anaerobic conditions (where there is no oxygen) by the bacterium Clostridium botulinum.

Clostridium botulinum is a large anaerobic Gram-positive bacillus that forms subterminal endospores.

There are eight serological varieties of the bacterium denoted by the letters A to H. The toxin from all of these acts in the same way and produces similar symptoms: the motor nerve endings are prevented from releasing acetylcholine, causing flaccid paralysis and symptoms of blurred vision, ptosis, nausea, vomiting, diarrhea or constipation, cramps, and respiratory difficulty.

Botulinum toxin is broken into eight neurotoxins (labeled as types A, B, C [C1, C2], D, E, F, and G), which are antigenically and serologically distinct but structurally similar. Human botulism is caused mainly by types A, B, E, and (rarely) F. Types C and D cause toxicity only in other animals.

In October 2013, scientists released news of the discovery of type H, the first new botulism neurotoxin found in forty years. However, further studies showed type H to be a chimeric toxin composed of parts of types F and A (FA).

Some types produce a characteristic putrefactive smell and digest meat (types A and some of B and F); these are said to be proteolytic; type E and some types of B, C, D, and F are nonproteolytic and can go undetected because there is no strong odor associated with them.

When the bacteria are under stress, they develop inert spores. Their natural habitats are in the soil, in the silt that comprises the bottom sediment of streams, lakes, and coastal waters and oceans, while some types are natural inhabitants of the intestinal tracts of mammals (e.g., horses, cattle, humans) and are present in their excreta. The spores can survive in their inert form for many years.

Toxin is produced by the bacteria when environmental conditions are favourable for the spores to replicate and grow, but the gene that encodes the toxin protein is actually carried by a virus or phage that infects the bacteria. Little is known about the natural factors that control phage infection and replication within the bacteria.

The spores require warm temperatures, a protein source, an anaerobic environment, and moisture in order to become active and produce toxin. In the wild, decomposing vegetation and invertebrates combined with warm temperatures can provide ideal conditions for the botulism bacteria to activate and produce toxin that may affect feeding birds and other animals. Spores are not killed by boiling, but botulism is uncommon because special, rarely obtained conditions are necessary for botulinum toxin production from C. botulinum spores, including an anaerobic, low-salt, low-acid, low-sugar environment at ambient temperatures.

Botulinum inhibits the release within the nervous system of acetylcholine, a neurotransmitter responsible for communication between motor neurons and muscle cells. All forms of botulism lead to paralysis that typically starts with the muscles of the face and then spreads towards the limbs. In severe forms, botulism leads to paralysis of the breathing muscles and causes respiratory failure. In light of this life-threatening complication, all suspected cases of botulism are treated as medical emergencies, and public health officials are usually involved to identify the source and take steps to prevent further cases from occurring.

Botulinum toxins A and E specifically cleave SNAP-25, whereas serotypes B, D, F and G cut synaptobrevin. Serotype C cleaves both SNAP-25 and syntaxin. This causes blockade of neurotransmitter acetylcholine release, ultimately leading to paralysis.

== Diagnosis ==
For botulism in babies, diagnosis should be made on signs and symptoms. Confirmation of the diagnosis is made by testing of a stool or enema specimen with the mouse bioassay.

In people whose history and physical examination suggest botulism, these clues are often not enough to allow a diagnosis. Other diseases such as Guillain–Barré syndrome, stroke, and myasthenia gravis can appear similar to botulism, and special tests may be needed to exclude these other conditions. These tests may include a brain scan, cerebrospinal fluid examination, nerve conduction test (electromyography, or EMG), and an edrophonium chloride (Tensilon) test for myasthenia gravis. A definite diagnosis can be made if botulinum toxin is identified in the food, stomach or intestinal contents, vomit or feces. The toxin is occasionally found in the blood in peracute cases. Botulinum toxin can be detected by a variety of techniques, including enzyme-linked immunosorbent assays (ELISAs), electrochemiluminescent (ECL) tests and mouse inoculation or feeding trials. The toxins can be typed with neutralization tests in mice. In toxicoinfectious botulism, the organism can be cultured from tissues. On egg yolk medium, toxin-producing colonies usually display surface iridescence that extends beyond the colony.

== Prevention ==
Although the vegetative form of the bacteria is destroyed by boiling, the spore itself is not killed by the temperatures reached with normal sea-level-pressure boiling, leaving it free to grow and again produce the toxin when conditions are right.

A recommended prevention measure for infant botulism is to avoid giving honey to infants less than 12 months of age, as botulinum spores are often present. In older children and adults the normal intestinal bacteria suppress development of C. botulinum.

While commercially canned goods are required to undergo a "botulinum cook" in a pressure cooker at 121 °C (250 °F) for 3 minutes, and thus rarely cause botulism, there have been notable exceptions. Two were the 1978 Alaskan salmon outbreak and the 2007 Castleberry's Food Company outbreak. Foodborne botulism is the rarest form, accounting for only around 15% of cases (US) and has more frequently resulted from home-canned foods with low acid content, such as carrot juice, asparagus, green beans, beets, and corn. However, outbreaks of botulism have resulted from more unusual sources. In July 2002, fourteen Alaskans ate muktuk (whale meat) from a beached whale, and eight of them developed symptoms of botulism, two of them requiring mechanical ventilation.

Other, much rarer sources of infection (about every decade in the US) include garlic or herbs stored covered in oil without acidification, chili peppers, improperly handled baked potatoes wrapped in aluminum foil, tomatoes, and home-canned or fermented fish.

When canning or preserving food at home, attention should be paid to hygiene, pressure, temperature, refrigeration and storage. When making home preserves, only acidic fruit such as apples, pears, stone fruits and berries should be used. Tropical fruit and tomatoes are low in acidity and must have some acidity added before they are canned.

Low-acid foods have pH values higher than 4.6. They include red meats, seafood, poultry, milk, and all fresh vegetables except for most tomatoes. Most mixtures of low-acid and acid foods also have pH values above 4.6 unless their recipes include enough lemon juice, citric acid, or vinegar to make them acidic. Acid foods have a pH of 4.6 or lower. They include fruits, pickles, sauerkraut, jams, jellies, marmalades, and fruit butters.

Although tomatoes usually are considered an acidic food, some are now known to have pH values slightly above 4.6. Figs also have pH values slightly above 4.6. Therefore, if they are to be canned as acid foods, these products must be acidified to a pH of 4.6 or lower with lemon juice or citric acid. Properly acidified tomatoes and figs are acid foods and can be safely processed in a boiling-water canner.

Oils infused with fresh garlic or herbs should be acidified and refrigerated. Potatoes that have been baked while wrapped in aluminum foil should be kept hot until served or refrigerated. Because high temperatures destroy the botulism toxin, home-canned foods are best boiled for 10 minutes before eating. Metal cans containing food in which bacteria are growing may bulge outwards due to gas production from bacterial growth or the food inside may be foamy or have a bad odor; cans with any of these signs should be discarded.

Any container of food that has been heat-treated and then assumed to be airtight, but shows signs of not being so, e.g., metal cans with pinprick holes from rust or mechanical damage, should be discarded. Contamination of a canned food solely with C. botulinum may not cause any visual defects to the container, such as bulging. Only assurance of sufficient thermal processing during production, and absence of a route for subsequent contamination, should be used as indicators of food safety.

The addition of nitrites and nitrates to processed meats such as ham, bacon, and sausages reduces growth and toxin production of C. botulinum. Other food additives (such as lactate and sorbate) provide similar protection against bacteria, but do not provide a desirable pink color.

=== Vaccine ===
A vaccine for botulism exists, but it is rarely used. The US CDC discontinued use of the vaccine in 2011 when the available product showed declining potency and an increase in moderate local reactions to booster shots. As of 2017, work to develop a better vaccine was being carried out. The US FDA had not approved any vaccine against botulism.

== Treatment ==
Botulism is generally treated with botulism antitoxin and supportive care.

Supportive care for botulism includes monitoring of respiratory function. Respiratory failure due to paralysis may require mechanical ventilation for 2 to 8 weeks, plus intensive medical and nursing care. After this time, paralysis generally improves as new neuromuscular connections are formed.

In some abdominal cases, physicians may try to remove contaminated food still in the digestive tract by inducing vomiting or using enemas. Wounds should be treated, usually surgically, to remove the source of the toxin-producing bacteria.

=== Antitoxin ===
Botulinum antitoxin consists of antibodies that neutralize botulinum toxin in the circulatory system by passive immunization. This prevents additional toxin from binding to the neuromuscular junction, but does not reverse any already inflicted paralysis.

In adults, a trivalent antitoxin containing antibodies raised against botulinum toxin types A, B, and E is used most commonly; however, a heptavalent botulism antitoxin has also been developed and was approved by the U.S. FDA in 2013. In infants, horse-derived antitoxin is sometimes avoided for fear of infants developing serum sickness or lasting hypersensitivity to horse-derived proteins. To avoid this, a human-derived antitoxin has been developed and approved by the U.S. FDA in 2003 for the treatment of infant botulism. This human-derived antitoxin is both safe and effective for the treatment of infant botulism. However, the danger of equine-derived antitoxin to infants has not been clearly established, and one study showed the equine-derived antitoxin to be both safe and effective for the treatment of infant botulism.

Trivalent (A, B, and E) botulinum antitoxin is derived from equine sources utilizing whole antibodies (Fab and Fc portions). In the United States, this antitoxin is available from the local health department via the CDC. The second antitoxin, heptavalent (A, B, C, D, E, F, G) botulinum antitoxin, is derived from "despeciated" equine IgG antibodies which have had the Fc portion cleaved off, leaving the F(ab')2 portions. This less immunogenic antitoxin is effective against all known strains of botulism where not contraindicated.

== Prognosis ==
The paralysis caused by botulism can persist for two to eight weeks, during which supportive care and ventilation may be necessary to keep the patient alive. Botulism can be fatal in five to ten percent of people who are affected. However, if left untreated, botulism is fatal in 40 to 50 percent of cases.

Infant botulism typically has no long-term side effects but can be complicated by treatment-associated adverse events. The case fatality rate is less than two percent for hospitalized babies.

== Epidemiology ==
Globally, botulism is fairly rare, with approximately 1,000 identified cases yearly.

=== United States ===
In 2021, health departments reported 273 confirmed and probable cases of botulism in the United States. Of these, 66% were infant botulism, 24% wound botulism, 8% foodborne botulism, and 2% were of other or unknown etiology. Infant botulism is still predominantly sporadic rather than epidemic, but marked geographic variability persists; California accounted for 45 cases (25%) and Pennsylvania for 21 cases (12%) of the 2021 infant total.

Between 1990 and 2000, the Centers for Disease Control and Prevention (CDC) recorded 263 individual food-borne cases from 160 botulism events in the United States, with a case-fatality rate of 4%. Thirty-nine percent (103 cases and 58 events) occurred in Alaska, all attributable to traditional Alaska Native foods. In the lower 49 states, home-canned food was implicated in 70 events (~69%), with canned asparagus being the most frequent source. Two restaurant-associated outbreaks affected 25 people. The median number of cases per year was 23 (range 17–43) and the median number of events per year was 14 (range 9–24). The highest incidence rates occurred in Alaska, Idaho, Washington, and Oregon; all other states had an incidence rate of ≤1 case per ten million population.

The number of food-borne and infant botulism cases has remained relatively stable in recent years. Wound botulism continues to rise—largely linked to injection-drug use, particularly black-tar heroin in California.

All data regarding botulism antitoxin releases and laboratory confirmation of cases in the US are recorded annually by the Centers for Disease Control and Prevention and published on their website.

- Between 31 March and 6 April 1977, 59 individuals developed type B botulism. All who fell ill had eaten at the same Mexican restaurant in Pontiac, Michigan, and had consumed a hot sauce made with improperly home-canned jalapeño peppers, either by adding it to their food or by eating nachos that had been prepared with the hot sauce. The full clinical spectrum (mild symptomatology with neurologic findings through life-threatening ventilatory paralysis) of type B botulism was documented.
- In April 1994, the largest outbreak of botulism in the United States since 1978 occurred in El Paso, Texas. Thirty people were affected; 4 required mechanical ventilation. All ate food from a Greek restaurant. The attack rate among people who ate a potato-based dip was 86% (19/22) compared with 6% (11/176) among people who did not eat the dip. The attack rate among people who ate an eggplant-based dip was 67% (6/9) compared with 13% (24/189) among people who did not. Botulism toxin type A was detected in patients and in both dips. Toxin formation resulted from holding aluminum foil-wrapped baked potatoes at room temperature, apparently for several days, before they were used in the dips. Food handlers should be informed of the potential hazards caused by holding foil-wrapped potatoes at ambient temperatures after cooking.
- In 2002, fourteen Alaskans ate muktuk (whale blubber) from a beached whale, resulting in eight of them developing botulism, with two of the affected requiring mechanical ventilation.
- Beginning in late June 2007, 8 people contracted botulism poisoning by eating canned food products produced by Castleberry's Food Company in its Augusta, Georgia plant. It was later identified that the Castleberry's plant had serious production problems on a specific line of retorts that had under-processed the cans of food. These issues included broken cooking alarms, leaking water valves and inaccurate temperature devices, all the result of poor management of the company. All of the victims were hospitalized and placed on mechanical ventilation. The Castleberry's Food Company outbreak was the first instance of botulism in commercially canned foods in the United States in over 30 years.
- One person died, 21 cases were confirmed, and 10 more were suspected in Lancaster, Ohio when a botulism outbreak occurred after a church potluck in April 2015. The suspected source was a salad made from home-canned potatoes.
- A botulism outbreak occurred in Northern California in May 2017 after 10 people consumed nacho cheese dip served at a gas station in Sacramento County. One man died as a result of the outbreak.
- In 2025, 13 cases of infant botulism were reported across 10 states due to contaminated ByHeart Whole Nutrition Infant Formula, which resulted in broad recalls.

=== United Kingdom ===
The largest recorded outbreak of foodborne botulism in the United Kingdom occurred in June 1989. A total of 27 patients were affected; one patient died. Twenty-five of the patients had eaten one brand of hazelnut yogurt in the week before the onset of symptoms. Control measures included the cessation of all yogurt production by the implicated producer, the withdrawal of the firm's yogurts from sale, the recall of cans of the hazelnut conserve, and advice to the general public to avoid the consumption of all hazelnut yogurts.

=== China ===
From 1958 to 1983, there were 986 outbreaks of botulism in China involving 4,377 people with 548 deaths.

==== Qapqal disease ====
After the Chinese Communist Revolution in 1949, a mysterious plague (named Qapqal disease) was noticed to be affecting several Sibe villages in Qapqal Xibe Autonomous County. It was endemic with distinctive epidemic patterns, yet the underlying cause remained unknown for a long period of time. It caused a number of deaths and forced some people to leave the place.

In 1958, a team of experts was sent to the area by the Ministry of Health to investigate the cases. The epidemic survey conducted proved that the disease was primarily type A botulism, with several cases of type B. The team also discovered that the source of the botulinum was local fermented grain and beans, as well as a raw meat food called mi song hu hu. They promoted the improvement of fermentation techniques among local residents, and thus eliminated the disease.

=== Canada ===
From 1985 to 2005 there were outbreaks causing 91 confirmed cases of foodborne botulism in Canada, 85% of which were in Inuit communities, especially Nunavik, as well as First Nations of the coast of British Columbia, following consumption of traditionally prepared marine mammal and fish products.

=== Ukraine ===
In 2017, there were 70 cases of botulism with 8 deaths in Ukraine. The previous year, there were 115 cases with 12 deaths. Most cases were the result of dried fish, a common local drinking snack.

=== Vietnam ===
In 2020, several cases of botulism were reported in Vietnam. All of them were related to a product containing contaminated vegetarian pâté. Some patients were put on life support.

== Other susceptible species ==
Botulism can occur in many vertebrates and invertebrates. Botulism has been reported in species such as rats, mice, chicken, frogs, toads, goldfish, Aplysia, squid, crayfish, Drosophila, and leeches.

Death from botulism is common in waterfowl; an estimated 10,000 to 100,000 birds die of botulism annually. The disease is commonly called "limberneck". In some large outbreaks, a million or more birds may die. Ducks appear to be affected most often. An enzootic form of duck botulism in the Western US and Canada is known as "western duck sickness". Botulism also affects commercially raised poultry. In chickens, the mortality rate varies from a few birds to 40% of the flock.

Botulism seems to be relatively uncommon in domestic mammals; however, in some parts of the world, epidemics with up to 65% mortality are seen in cattle. The prognosis is poor in large animals that are recumbent.

In cattle, the symptoms may include drooling, restlessness, incoordination, urine retention, dysphagia, and sternal recumbency. Laterally recumbent animals are usually very close to death. In sheep, the symptoms may include drooling, a serous nasal discharge, stiffness, and incoordination. Abdominal respiration may be observed, and the tail may switch on the side. As the disease progresses, the limbs may become paralyzed, and death may occur. Phosphorus-deficient cattle, especially in southern Africa, are inclined to ingest bones and carrion containing clostridial toxins and consequently develop lame sickness or lamsiekte.

The clinical signs in horses are similar to cattle. The muscle paralysis is progressive; it usually begins at the hindquarters and gradually moves to the front limbs, neck, and head. Death generally occurs 24 to 72 hours after initial symptoms and results from respiratory paralysis. Some foals are found dead without other clinical signs.

Clostridium botulinum type C toxin has been implicated as the cause of grass sickness, a condition in horses which occurs in rainy and hot summers in Northern Europe. The main symptom is pharynx paralysis.

Domestic dogs may develop systemic toxemia after consuming C. botulinum type C exotoxin or spores within bird carcasses or other infected meat but are generally resistant to the more severe effects of C. botulinum type C. Symptoms include flaccid muscle paralysis, which can lead to death due to cardiac and respiratory arrest.

Pigs are relatively resistant to botulism. Reported symptoms include anorexia, refusal to drink, vomiting, pupillary dilation, and muscle paralysis.

In poultry and wild birds, flaccid paralysis is usually seen in the legs, wings, neck, and eyelids. Broiler chickens with the toxicoinfectious form may also have diarrhea with excess urates.

=== Prevention in non-human species ===
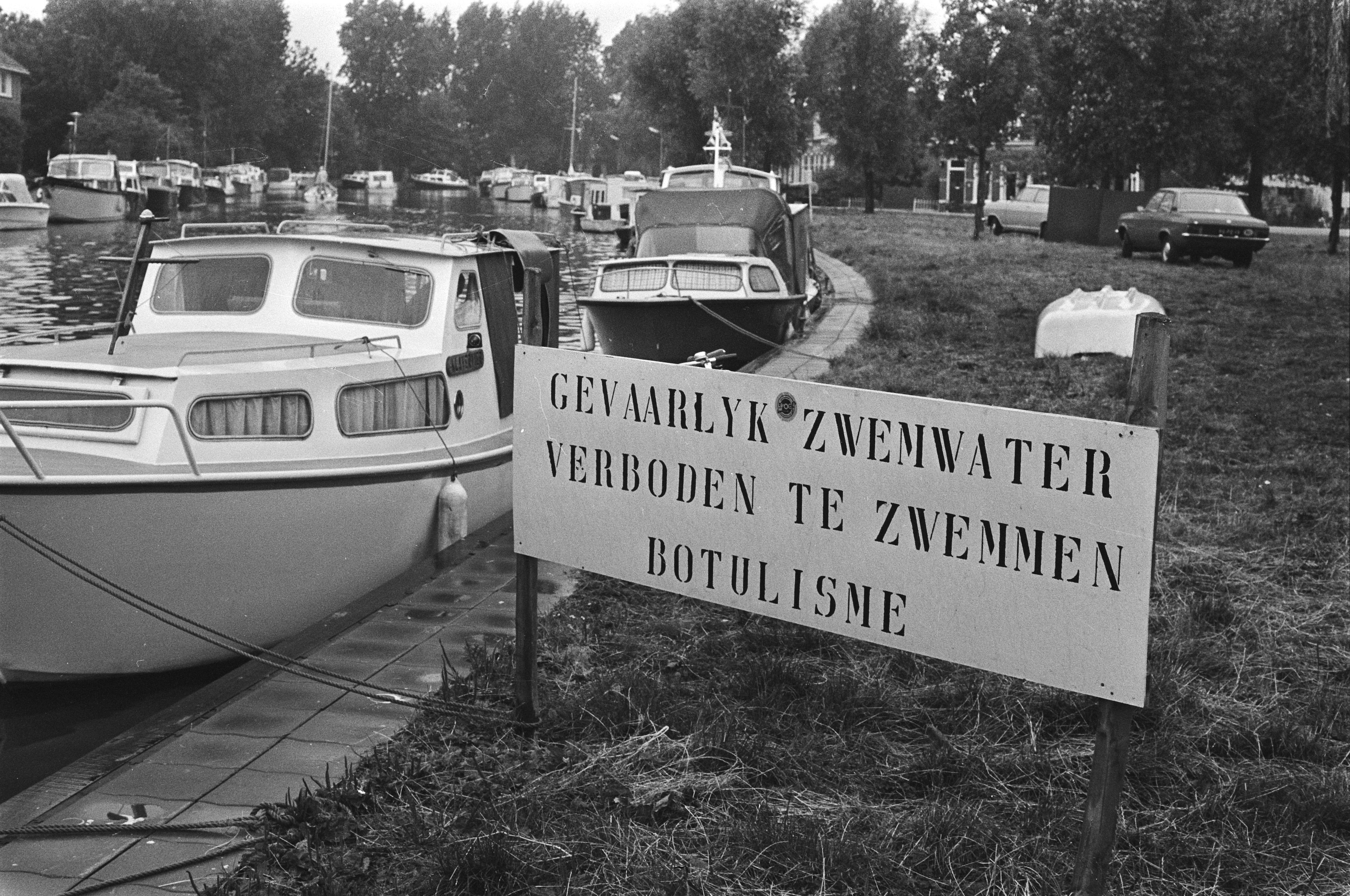
Sign on the Noordhollandsch Kanaal in 1976, warning bathers of the presence of C. botulinum in the water.

One of the main routes of exposure for botulism is through the consumption of food contaminated with C. botulinum. Food-borne botulism can be prevented in domestic animals through careful inspection of the feed, purchasing high-quality feed from reliable sources, and ensuring proper storage. Poultry litter and animal carcasses are places in which C. botulinum spores are able to germinate, so it is advised to avoid spreading poultry litter or any carcass-containing materials on fields producing feed materials due to their potential for supporting C. botulinum growth. Additionally, water sources should be checked for dead or dying animals, and fields should be checked for animal remains before mowing for hay or silage. Correcting any dietary deficiencies can also prevent animals from consuming contaminated materials such as bones or carcasses. Raw materials used for silage or feed mixed on site should be checked for any sign of mold or rotten appearance. Acidification of animal feed can reduce, but will not eliminate, the risk of toxin formation, especially in carcasses that remain whole.

==== Vaccines in animals ====
Vaccines have been developed for use in animals to prevent botulism. The availability and approval of these vaccines vary depending on the location, with places experiencing more cases generally having more vaccines available, and routine vaccination is more common.

A variety of vaccines have been developed for the prevention of botulism in livestock. Most initial vaccinations require multiple doses at intervals of 2–6 weeks; however, some newer vaccines require only one shot. This mainly depends on the type of vaccine and the manufacturer's recommendations. All vaccines require annual boosters to maintain immunity. Many of these vaccines can be used on multiple species, including cattle, sheep, and goats, with some labeled for use in horses and mules as well as separate vaccines for mink. Additionally, vaccination during an outbreak is as beneficial as therapeutic treatment in cattle, and this method is also used in horses and pheasants.

The use of region-specific toxoids to immunize animals has been shown to be effective. Toxoid types C and D used to immunize cattle is a useful vaccination method in South Africa and Australia. Toxoid has also been shown to be an appropriate method of immunizing minks and pheasants. In endemic areas, for example, Kentucky, vaccination with type B toxoid appears to be effective.

== Use in biological warfare and terrorism ==
=== United States ===
Based on CIA research in Fort Detrick on biological warfare, anthrax and botulism were widely regarded as the two most effective options. During the 1950s, a highly lethal strain was discovered during the biological warfare program. The CIA continued to hold 5 grams of Clostridium botulinum, even after Nixon's ban on biological warfare in 1969. During the Gulf War, when the United States was concerned with a potential biowarfare attack, the efforts around botulism turned to prevention. However, the only way to make antitoxin in the U.S. until the 1990s was by drawing antibodies from a single horse named First Flight, raising much concern from Pentagon health officials.

=== Iraq ===
Iraq has historically possessed many types of germs, including botulism. The American Type Culture Collection sold 5 variants of botulinum to the University of Baghdad in May 1986. 1991 CIA reports also show Iraqis filled shells, warheads, and bombs with biological agents like botulinum (though none have been deployed). The Iraqi air force used the code name "tea" to refer to botulinum, and it was also referred to as bioweapon "A."

=== Japan ===
A Japanese cult called Aum Shinrikyo created laboratories that produced biological weapons, specifically botulinum, anthrax, and Q fever. From 1990 to 1995, the cult staged numerous unsuccessful bioterrorism attacks on civilians. They sprayed botulinum toxin from a truck in downtown Tokyo and at Narita Airport, but there are no reported cases of botulism as a result.

== See also ==
- List of foodborne illness outbreaks
- Botulinum toxin
