= ARSD =

ARSD or ArsD may refer to:

- ARS-D, the Alliance for the Re-liberation of Somalia
- ArsD, a trans-acting repressor of the arsRDABC operon that confers resistance to arsenicals and antimonials in Escherichia coli; see Ars operon
- A US Navy hull classification symbol: Salvage lifting vessel (ARSD)
- ARSD, a type of arylsulfatase
- ARSD, the New York Stock Exchange symbol for the Arabian American Development Company
- Atma Ram Sanatan Dharma College, formerly Sanatan Dharma College, a co-educational constituent college of the University of Delhi in India
- The American Roller Skating Derby, a professional roller derby league in the United States
- Aleutian Region School District
