= Bioactive paper =

Paper treated to react to contaminants

Bioactive paper is a paper-based sensor that can identify various contaminants in food and water. First developed in 2009, bioactive paper research has been ongoing and in 2011 was awarded a 5-year grant totalling $7.5 million CAD. It has been developed at the biosensor stage level, which means it can detect pesticides but is not yet able to repel and deactivate toxins. However, its ability to detect potential hazards has applications for human health and safety. The benefits of bioactive paper are that it is simple, portable, disposable, and inexpensive.

== Development ==
Bioactive paper was developed by Canada’s Sentinel Bioactive Paper Network, a consortium of researchers, industrial and university, partners, and students. The Network is hosted by McMaster University in Hamilton, Ontario and is led by Dr. Robert Pelton, scientific director and Dr. George Rosenberg, managing director.

John Brennan and his research team at McMaster University developed the method to create bioactive paper by printing contaminant-detecting biosensors that are based on combinations of antibodies, enzymes, aptamers or bacteriophages, onto the structure of the paper. These combinations then attach themselves to pathogens and other contaminants resulting in a detectable response. The biologically active chemicals are in the form of an ‘ink’ that can be printed, coated or impregnated onto or into paper using existing paper-making and high-speed printing processes. This ink is coated in different layers. The ink is similar to that found in a regular computer print cartridge, but it has special additives that make it biocompatible.

It is made up of biocompatible silica nanoparticles that are deposited onto the paper first, then another ink containing the enzyme is applied. The bio-ink result forms a thin film of enzyme that is trapped in the silica on the paper. When the paper is exposed to a toxin, molecules in the ink change colour based on the amount of toxins in the sample.

While bioactive paper is not available to the public yet, it is getting closer to commercialization. Bioactive paper also has a good shelf life. Researchers said the strip could still be used effectively for at least two months when stored properly.

== Applications ==
One current application of bioactive paper can be applied to bioterrorism and food safety, as it can detect acetylcholinesterase, or a nerve agent. With this advancement, bioactive paper has become a product of interest for the military and the packaging industry. While efforts are underway to develop more applications of bioactive paper, there are currently four major areas of bioactive paper usage and research: paper-based bioassay or paper-based analytical devices for sample conditioning;pathogen detection for food and water quality monitoring; counterfeiting and countertempering in the packaging and construction industries; and deactivation of pathogenic bacteria using antimicrobial paper.

=== Food-borne illness ===
Approximately 76-million food-borne illnesses occur each in the United States, accounting for more than 325,000 hospitalizations and 5,000 deaths [Mead et al., 1999]. Most of these illnesses are caused by Campylobacter, Salmonella, Escherichia coli O157:H7 and Listeria monocytogenes. As a result, annual medical expenditures related to these pathogens currently exceed $7 billion US. Consumer education coupled with reliable and simple pathogen detection in food products offers the best method for dramatically reducing the frequency of occurrence of these illnesses.

The most recent development involved being able to detect pesticides on food even after they’ve been washed. This innovation is a benefit to developing countries that may use banned pesticides on their food because they’re cheaper.

=== Water contamination ===
In the developing world, the water is often of questionable quality, forcing the local population to try rudimentary filtration systems, such as the use of unsanitary cloth in a vain attempt to create potable water. This method is obviously not reliable and the results are rarely safe for consumption, particularly after floods and other natural disasters. Think of the benefits of a bioactive paper strip which, when dipped in small containers of water, can remove pathogens and give the user a colour indication that the water is safe to use.

=== Health care ===
Another potential use of bioactive paper includes the creation of face masks that protect health care workers by actively binding viruses and anchoring them to the filter surface which would prevent them from passing through the filter’s pores.

=== Packaging ===
Because it can easily test for certain components, there is interest for bioactive paper to be used in the packaging industry. Specifically, companies are considering bioactive paper as a way to detect counterfeit items or tampering. Other uses include microbial detection or possible antimicrobial properties.
