= First Flight (medical research horse) =

Source of the first botulinum antitoxin

- Sex: Male
- Foaled: 1967/8
- Died: 17 May 1999; Large Animal Research Facility, Fort Detrick
- Color: Black
- Owner: U.S. Army

First Flight was a thoroughbred horse used in the production of the first botulism antitoxin. The horse was used as a research animal between 1978 and 1993 to produce antitoxin for military and civilian personnel. Until the 1990s, serum derived from First Flight was the only source of the antitoxin in the United States.

== Background ==
First Flight was originally bred as a racehorse, but there are no records of him competing in a race in the National Sporting Library & Museum. He was reportedly 1,200 pounds (540 kg) and trained to serve as a caisson horse during military funerals at Arlington National Cemetery, but was skittish around crowds and prone to bolting.

== Antitoxin production ==
Botulinum toxin is a highly potent neurotoxin produced by the bacteria Clostridium botulinum, causing paralysis and often leading to death if untreated. There are three naturally occurring subtypes of botulism toxin; however, the four other known subtypes could be weaponised as bio-agents. Horses have been used in the production of antitoxin serum for various diseases since the 19th century due to their physical size and resilience. At age 10, in 1978, First Flight was selected to participate in the botulinum antitoxin program at the United States Army Medical Research Institute of Infectious Diseases (USAMRIID) at Fort Detrick, Maryland. Another army horse named Abe was also part of the program initially, but experiments and large-scale production of antitoxin utilised only plasma from First Flight, due to its reactivity against all subtypes of botulism toxin.

Researchers injected First Flight with modified, less-deadly toxoids from all seven subtypes until he gained immunity via the production of antibodies from his immune system. Then, they injected live bacteria to increase antibody production. There were around ten to one hundred times the amount of antibodies within First Flight's bloodstream than needed to neutralise the toxin. Blood drawn from First Flight was used to develop the antiserum. This program developed the first botulinum antitoxin, and First Flight was its only source until the 1990s.

In November 1980, First Flight was moved to the University of Minnesota for large-scale plasmapheresis and long-term storage of antibodies. As part of this, First Flight was immunised every forty to one hundred days and plasmapheresed eight times, each removing 10–15% of the animal's blood volume, during the cycle. While at the University of Minnesota, First Flight was permitted periods of rest and regularly tendered to. He was fed a diet of high-protein grain pellets and a daily hay ration. During his time as a research animal, he was often ill-tempered but not dangerous. Antibodies were harvested from First Flight until 1993, and nearly 1,600 litres (420 US gal) of blood were removed during his time in Minnesota.

In 1990, the U.S. Army requested a large production of botulinum antitoxin from the stored antibodies. It was shipped to Saudi Arabia in 1991 as a precaution to treat soldiers and civilians during the First Gulf War due to concern that Iraqi President Saddam Hussein might use biological weapons containing Botulinum toxin. The antitoxin serum has also been used to treat foodborne botulism and infant botulism.

== Death and legacy ==
First Flight died from natural causes, aged 31, in his paddock at the Large Animal Research Facility in Fort Detrick. The U.S. Army erected a stone memorial and planted a tree in his honour at Fort Detrick to commemorate his contribution to science. First Flight's ashes are buried nearby. The National Museum of American History holds the horse's halter, lead chain and a vial of antitoxin derived from its blood in its collections. As of January 2024, they are not currently on display.

In 2010, Heptavalent botulism antitoxin (HBAT) was introduced. It is effective against all seven botulinum toxin subtypes and replaces all earlier non-infant products. HBAT is produced by harvesting antibodies from horses that have been inoculated with botulism, building upon the earlier work developing antitoxin serum from First Flight.
