= Heptavalent botulism antitoxin =

Clinical data
- Trade names: BAT
- Other names: HBAT, H-BAT
- ATC code: None

Legal status
- Legal status: CA: ℞-only; US: ℞-only

The Botulism Antitoxin Heptavalent (A, B, C, D, E, F, G) - (Equine) (trade name BAT), made by Emergent BioSolutions Canada Inc. (formerly Cangene Corporation), is a licensed, commercially available botulism anti-toxin that effectively neutralizes all seven known botulinum nerve toxin serotypes (types A, B, C, D, E, F and G). It is indicated for sporadic cases of life-threatening botulism and is also stockpiled for the eventuality of botulinum nerve toxins being used in a future bioterrorist attack.

BAT was first approved in 2010 by the Centers for Disease Control for the indication of treating naturally occurring non-infant botulism on an investigational basis, replacing two earlier products. It was then licensed for commercial marketing by the United States FDA in 2013.

== Medical use ==
=== Indications ===
BAT is the only FDA-approved product available for treating botulism in adults, and for botulism in infants caused by botulinum toxins other than types A and B. BAT has been used to treat a case of type F infant botulism and, on a case-by-case basis, may be used for future cases of non-type A and non-type B infant botulism.

=== Administration ===
Early administration of BAT is considered critical as the antitoxin can neutralize only circulating toxin, not toxin that has become bound to nerve terminals.

One vial (20 mL) of BAT is administered to a patient as an intravenous infusion. It must be diluted with 0.9% sodium chloride in a 1:10 ratio before use. A volumetric infusion pump is used for slow administration (0.5 mL/min for the initial 30 minutes) to minimize the possibility of allergic reactions. If no reactions are noted, the rate is increased to 1 mL/min for another 30 minutes, and then if still no reaction is evident, to 2 mL/min for the remainder of the procedure.

== Side effects ==
In CDC studies of BAT, headache, fever, chills, rash, itching, and nausea were the most observed adverse events. It can trigger allergic reactions and delayed hypersensitivity reactions in people sensitive to horse proteins.

== Chemistry and pharmacology ==
BAT is derived from "despeciated" equine IgG antibodies, which have had the Fc portion cleaved off, leaving the F(ab')_{2} portions. Compared to whole antibodies, as found in trivalent botulinum antitoxin (TBAT) available from local health departments (via the CDC), F(ab')_{2} is less efficacious at neutralizing toxin, but should carry a reduced risk of anaphylaxis.

Unlike TBAT, BAT is considered effective against all known strains of botulism (A, B, C, D, E, F, and G). All antitoxins neutralize only circulating toxin in patients with symptoms of botulism that are continuing to progress; they have no effect on toxin already bound to the nerve terminals. (This is not, however, considered a reason to withhold the product from any patient, even if treatment has been delayed.)

== Military variants ==
A related product, Botulism AntiToxin, Heptavalent, Equine, Types A, B, C, D, E, F and G (HE-BAT), is also available to the U.S. military under IND (experimental) protocols. This "equine" antitoxin requires skin testing with escalating dose challenges before full dose administration to obviate serious sensitivity to horse serum, as it consists of the whole non-despeciated antibody.

The US Department of Defence also stocks HFabBAT, the despeciated version of HE-BAT, similar to BAT.

== History ==
=== Development and domestic contracts ===
BAT (formerly known as HBAT) was developed from equine (horse) plasma at the U.S. Army Medical Research Institute of Infectious Diseases (USAMRIID). The main funding stream was the Biomedical Advanced Research and Development Authority (within the US Department of Health and Human Services' Office of the Assistant Secretary for Preparedness and Response). It was then available for many years on an IND (investigational) basis from the US Centers for Disease Control and Prevention (CDC).

On June 1, 2006, the DHHS awarded a $363 million contract to Emergent BioSolutions, (then Cangene Corporation) for 200,000 doses of BAT over five years for delivery into the US Strategic National Stockpile (SNS). The CDC began supplying doses to the SNS in 2007 under a now $427 million contract with the DHHS, according to a Cangene press release. In 2010, the CDC replaced the licensed bivalent botulinum antitoxin AB (BAT-AB) and the investigational monovalent botulinum antitoxin E (BAT-E) with BAT when the former two products indications expired. This action left BAT as the only botulinum antitoxin available in the US for naturally occurring non-infant botulism.

On March 22, 2013, the US Food and Drug Administration (FDA) approved BAT as the first product to treat all serotypes of botulism. This was considered a significant step in the US armamentarium for emergency use against a bioterrorist attack. The CDC continues to distribute the stockpiled antitoxin.

The FDA approved BAT for marketing based on its efficacy as established in animal studies (efficacy trials in humans not being considered feasible or ethical). The safety of the antitoxin, however, was established in a study of 40 healthy volunteers as well as in the experimental treatment of 228 patients in a CDC program.

After the February 2014 acquisition of Cangene Corporation by Emergent BioSolutions, Emergent took control of Cangene's products and contracts, including BAT. In March 2017, Emergent extended its contract with the Biomedical Advanced Research and Development Authority (BARDA), adding $53 million in value throughout 2022 for the production and bulk storage of BAT. Under the conditions of the extension, future transport of BAT to the SNS was approved. BAT remains the only recognized, licensed, and distributed botulism antitoxin within the FDA and the CDC.

=== Other Licensed Jurisdictions and Contracts ===
In 2012, Emergent signed a 10-year contract to provide BAT to the Canadian Department of National Defense and the Public Health Agency of Canada, as well as individual provincial health officials. In December 2016, Health Canada approved Emergent's New Drug Submission for BAT under the Extraordinary Use New Drug Regulations, which provide guidelines for consideration of drugs that do not have clinical information about impacts on humans due to the nature of the conditions that the drugs are used to treat. Pleased with Canada's decision to prepare for botulinum toxin events, one of the "more likely biological threat agents", Adam Havey, executive vice president and president of the biodefense division at Emergent BioSolutions, said, "Emergent is committed to helping allied governments fulfill their preparedness needs. We expect to expand upon our longstanding relationship with the Canadian government and develop similar relations outside of North America..."

BAT was approved by the Health Sciences Authority in Singapore in July 2019.

== FDA clinical trials ==
BAT has undergone extensive testing for effectiveness and safety. Emergent BioSolutions, in a 2017 document published to describe prescription information for BAT, said that the effectiveness of the antitoxin is based on efficacy studies that demonstrably prove increased chances of survival. In two clinical studies cited by the company, the safety profile of BAT was proven acceptable when one or two vials of the antitoxin were intravenously delivered to healthy subjects.

Another clinical trial, the BT-011 study, known also as Pharmacokinetics of Botulism Antitoxin Heptavalent in Pediatric Patients, was initiated to test the success of BAT in children who had contracted botulism (or had been suspected of contracting botulism). In the study, a serum sample was collected from pediatric patients to analyze the pharmacokinetics of BAT to better adjust pediatric dosing recommendations. The details of the study from ClinicalTrials.gov, are as follows:

Item	Value
First received	January 29, 2014
Last updated	August 19, 2016
Last verified	August 2016
Study Type	Interventional
Study Design	Intervention Model: Single Group Assignment; Masking: Open Label; Primary Purpose: Basic Science
Official Title	Pharmacokinetics of Botulism Antitoxin Heptavalent (A, B, C, D, E, F, G) - (Equine) (BAT) in Pediatric Patients With a Confirmed or Suspected Exposure to Botulinum Toxin
Condition	Botulism
Intervention	Biological: collection of one 5 mL of blood
Purpose	"The purpose of this study is to verify the pediatric dosing recommendations for BAT in pediatric patients that are treated with BAT due to a confirmed or suspected case of botulism. One 5 mL blood sample will be obtained within 24 hours post BAT administration. Study BT-011 will be run concurrently with the BAT patient registry (BT-010)."
Estimated Enrollment	10
Study Start Date	October 2014
Estimated Study Completion Date	April 2018
Estimated Primary Completion Date	October 2017 (Final data collection date for primary outcome measure)
Ages Eligible for Study	Up to 16 years (child)
Sexes Eligible for Study	All
Accepts Healthy Volunteers	No
Inclusion Criteria	Informed consent/assent; Pediatric patients (preterm and term newborn infants, infants and toddlers, children, and adolescents up to age 16); Confirmed or suspected exposure to botulinum toxin; Treatment with BAT from the Strategic National Stockpile or from state stockpiles
Exclusion Criteria	Exclusion if blood sample cannot be collected within 24 hours of administration of the antitoxin; 5 mL blood sample volume may be considered unsafe based on the weight of the patient, calling for removal of the subject from study
ClinicalTrials.gov identifier	NCT02051062

== See also ==
- Antitoxin
- First Flight (medical research horse)
- Passive immunity
