= Castleberry's Food Company =

American canned food brand

Castleberry's Food Company'
- Castleberry's corporate logo
- Founded: 1920s
- Founders: Clement Stewart Castleberry, Clement Lamar Castleberry
- Headquarters: Augusta, Georgia
- Products: Canned food
- Owner: Hanover

Castleberry's Food Company is an Augusta, Georgia-based canned food company founded in the 1920s by Clement Stewart Castleberry with the help of his father Clement Lamar Castleberry and closed in March 2008 by the United States Food and Drug Administration until Hanover Foods bought the rights to Castleberry's food and name.

The company grew from a payroll of two to over 400 workers at its peak. Castleberry's was sold by the Castleberry family in 1991 to Robert Kirby. Kirby later sold the company to Connors Brothers Limited, parent company of Bumble Bee Foods of Toronto, Ontario, Canada. Due to problems with quality control, the brand experienced problems when it shipped products that were underprocessed, resulting in several cases of botulism and subsequent widespread recall, and the cessation of production at their food processing plant. Hanover continues to sell products like chili and beef stew under the Castleberry's name.

== History ==
Castleberry's Food Company was founded in Augusta, Georgia as a canned food company in the 1920s by Clement Stewart Castleberry with the help of his father Clement Lamar Castleberry.

=== Canned chili sauce ===
The label affixed to cans of Castleberry's "Hot Dog Chili Sauce" contaminated with botulinum toxin

Beginning in June 2007, eight people contracted botulism due to the consumption of "Hot Dog Chili Sauce" and other products manufactured by the Castleberry's Food Company plant in Augusta, Georgia, which were under-processed, resulting in the production of botulinum toxin within the cans. At that time, the Castleberry's plant was owned and operated by Bumble Bee. While regular cooking will destroy botulinum toxin, the botulinum spores can only be killed by cooking at 121 °C for 3 minutes; hence, canned food must be prepared at the higher temperature to prevent the spores from producing more toxin after the canning process. The United States' Centers for Disease Control and Prevention attributed the food poisoning to Castleberry's Food Company's use of a defective canning process which did not reach the required temperature and duration. An FDA investigation later revealed that the problem arose from the use of canners which "had broken alarms, a leaky valve and an inaccurate temperature device." The Centers for Disease Control and Prevention (CDC) advised consumers to dispose of foods recalled due to the food poisoning incidents in the following manner:

Do not open or puncture any unopened can of the recalled product ... Dispose of food that may be contaminated by placing in a sealable bag, wrapping another plastic bag around the sealable bag, and then taping tightly. Place bags in a trash receptacle for non-recyclable trash outside the home and out of reach of humans and pets. Do not discard the food in a sink, garbage disposal, or toilet. Avoid splashing and contact with the skin. Wear rubber or latex gloves when handling open containers of food that you think may be contaminated. Wash hands with soap and running water for at least 2 minutes after handling food or containers that may be contaminated.

In total, 14 people in seven states (Texas – 4, Ohio – 3, Indiana – 2, Hawaii – 2, Georgia – 1, New Mexico – 1, California – 1) contracted botulism poisoning from Castleberry's chili products, under three different brands. The illnesses resulted in litigation against Castleberry's, Bumble Bee Foods, and the equipment manufacturer.

=== Temporary recommencement of food manufacturing ===
Following authorization by the FDA and USDA, Castleberry's Food Company restarted operations at its canning plant in September 2007, producing products which carried substantially different labeling and UPCs from those printed on cans of recalled food. Listed amongst the frequently asked questions on the Castleberry's Food Company Web site from November 2007 was the following query: "How do I know Castleberry's Food products are safe to eat?" However, in March 2008, the canning plant was closed when the FDA revoked the "temporary emergency operating permit" that was allowing production to continue.

=== Sale to Hanover Foods ===
After closing, Hanover Foods, best known for frozen and canned vegetables, bought the rights to Castleberry's food and name. Hanover continues to sell products like chili and beef stew under the Castleberry's name.
