= Magnotech =

Magnotech is a trademark designating a type of biosensor technology using magnetic nanoparticles to measure the concentration of target molecules in a matter of minutes. The technology is based on magnetic nanoparticles that are actuated by magnetic fields.

In the case of Siemens Healthineers' Atellica VTLi Patient-Side Immunoassay Analyzer, a cartridge is inserted into a hand-held analyzer. The cartridge contains the (bio)materials needed to run the assay test and is constructed entirely from plastic components, has no moving parts or embedded electronics, and is disposable.

When the cartridge is inserted into the analyzer, it automatically fills itself after applying a few droplets of sample. Once filled, no other fluid movement is required. The entire assay process within the cartridge is executed by controlled movement of the magnetic nanoparticles, using magnetic fields generated by the hand-held analyzer.

Major components of the analyzer are a single-board computer, a real-time data processing unit, an optical mechanical unit, and a touch-screen read-out display. Cardiac troponin I (cTnI) in human capillary (fingerstick) whole blood, and lithium-heparinized venous whole blood or plasma, can be measured on the Atellica VTLi Patient-Side Immunoassay Analyzer in about eight minutes.

The technology behind Magnotech was initiated by Philips Research Fellow, Menno Prins. In 2014 he became full professor at Eindhoven University of Technology.

Magnotech was used in the Minicare product of Philips Handheld Diagnostics, which was commercially launched in 2016. In 2018 the technology was spun out into Minicare BV, which was acquired by Siemens Healthineers in July 2019. Magnotech technology is used in Siemens' Atellica VTLi Patient-Side Immunoassay Analyzer.

Magnotech is a trademark of Siemens Healthineers AG registered with WIPO and other trademark offices.
