= Tripropylamine =

Names
- IUPAC name N,N-Dipropylpropan-1-amine

Identifiers
CAS Number	102-69-2
3D model (JSmol)	Interactive image
ChEBI	CHEBI:38880
ChemSpider	7334
ECHA InfoCard	100.002.771
EC Number	203-047-7
Gmelin Reference	101540
PubChem CID	7616
UNII	06S624V3U2
UN number	2260
CompTox Dashboard (EPA)	DTXSID9021849
- InChI: InChI=1S/C9H21N/c1-4-7-10(8-5-2)9-6-3/h4-9H2,1-3H3 Key: YFTHZRPMJXBUME-UHFFFAOYSA-N
- SMILES: CCCN(CCC)CCC

Properties
Appearance	colorless liquid
Density	0.7558 g/cm^{3}
Melting point	−93.5 °C (−136.3 °F; 179.7 K)
Boiling point	156 °C (313 °F; 429 K)

Hazards
- GHS labelling
Pictograms	(GHS05: Corrosive) (GHS06: Toxic) (GHS07: Exclamation mark) (GHS08: Health hazard)
Signal word	Danger
Hazard statements	H226, H301, H311, H314, H332, H335
Precautionary statements	P210, P233, P240, P241, P242, P243, P260, P262, P264, P264+P265, P270, P271, P273, P280, P301+P316, P301+P330+P331, P302+P352, P302+P361+P354, P303+P361+P353, P304+P340, P305+P354+P338, P316, P317, P319, P321, P330, P361+P364, P363, P370+P378, P403+P233, P403+P235, P405, P501
NFPA 704 (fire diamond)	2 2 0
- Except where otherwise noted, data are given for materials in their standard state (at 25 °C [77 °F], 100 kPa). Infobox references

Tripropylamine is an organic compound with the formula (CH_{3}CH_{2}CH_{2})_{3}N. It is classified as a tertiary amine. It is a colorless liquid with a "fishy" odor.

It has been used in electrochemiluminescence as a coreactant.

Synthesis method
