= Biointerface =

Type of interface

A biointerface is the region of contact between a biomolecule, cell, biological tissue or living organism or organic material considered living with another biomaterial or inorganic/organic material. The motivation for biointerface science stems from the urgent need to increase the understanding of interactions between biomolecules and surfaces. The behavior of complex macromolecular systems at materials interfaces are important in the fields of biology, biotechnology, diagnostics, and medicine. Biointerface science is a multidisciplinary field in which biochemists who synthesize novel classes of biomolecules (peptide nucleic acids, peptidomimetics, aptamers, ribozymes, and engineered proteins) cooperate with scientists who have developed the tools to position biomolecules with molecular precision (proximal probe methods, nano-and micro contact methods, e-beam and X-ray lithography, and bottom up self-assembly methods), scientists who have developed new spectroscopic techniques to interrogate these molecules at the solid-liquid interface, and people who integrate these into functional devices (applied physicists, analytical chemists and bioengineers). Well-designed biointerfaces would facilitate desirable interactions by providing optimized surfaces where biological matter can interact with other inorganic or organic materials, such as by promoting cell and tissue adhesion onto a surface.

Topics of interest include, but are not limited to:

- Neural interfaces
- Cells in engineered microenvironments and regenerative medicine
- Computational and modeling approaches to biointerfaces
- Membranes and membrane-based biosensing
- Peptides, carbohydrates and DNA at biointerfaces
- Pathogenesis and pathogen detection
- Molecularly designed interfaces
- Nanotube/nanoparticle interfaces

Related fields for biointerfaces are biomineralization, biosensors, medical implants, and so forth.

== Nanostructure interfaces ==
Nanotechnology is a rapidly growing field that has allowed for the creation of many different possibilities for creating biointerfaces. Nanostructures that are commonly used for biointerfaces include: metal nanomaterials such as gold and silver nanoparticles, semiconductor materials like silicon nanowires, carbon nanomaterials, and nanoporous materials. Due to the many properties unique to each nanomaterial, like size, conductivity, and construction, various applications have been achieved. For example, gold nanoparticles are often functionalized in order to act as drug delivery agents for cancers because their size allows them to collect at tumor sites passively. Also as an example, the use of silicon nanowires in nanoporous materials to create scaffolds for synthetic tissues allows for monitoring of electrical activity and electrical stimulation of cells as a result of the photoelectric properties of the silicon. The orientation of biomolecules on the interface can also be controlled through the modulation of parameters like pH, temperature and electrical field. For example, DNA grafted onto gold electrodes can be made to come closer to the electrode surface on application of positive electrode potential and as explained by Rant et al., this can be used to create smart interfaces for biomolecular detection. Likewise, Xiao Ma and others, have discussed the electrical control on the binding/unbinding of thrombin from aptamers immobilized on electrodes. They showed that on application of certain positive potentials, the thrombin gets separated from the biointerface.

=== Silicon nanowire interfaces ===
Silicon is a common material used in the technology industry due to its abundance as well as its properties as a semiconductor. However, in the bulk form used for computer chips and the like are not conducive to biointerfaces. For these purposes silicon nanowires (SiNWs) are often used. Various methods of growth and composition of SiNWs, such as etching, chemical vapor deposition, and doping, allow for the properties of the SiNWs to be customized for unique applications. One example of these unique uses is that SiNWs can be used as individual wires to be used for intracellular probes or extracellular devices or the SiNWs can be manipulated into larger macro structures. These structures can be manipulated into flexible, 3D, macropourus structures (like the scaffolds mentioned above) that can be used for creating synthetic extracellular matrices. In the case of Tian et al., cardiomyocytes were grown on these structures as a way to create a synthetic tissue structure that could be used to monitor the electrical activity of the cells on the scaffold. The device created by Tian et al. takes advantage of the fact that SiNWs are field-effect transistor (FET)-based devices. FET devices respond to electric potential charges at the surface of the device, or in this case the surface of the SiNW. Being a FET device can also be taken advantage of when using single SiNWs as biosensing devices. SiNW sensors are nanowires that contain specific receptors on their surface that when bound to their respective antigens will cause changes in conductivity. These sensors have the ability to be inserted into cells with minimal invasiveness making them in some ways preferable to traditional biosensors like fluorescent dyes, as well as other nanoparticles which require target labelling.
