= Impedance microbiology =

Measuring the microbial density in a sample via its electrical parameters

Impedance microbiology is a microbiological technique used to measure the microbial number density (mainly bacteria but also yeasts) of a sample by monitoring the electrical parameters of the growth medium. The ability of microbial metabolism to change the electrical conductivity of the growth medium was discovered by Stewart and further studied by other scientists such as Oker-Blom, Parson and Allison in the first half of 20th century. However, it was only in the late 1970s that, thanks to computer-controlled systems used to monitor impedance, the technique showed its full potential, as discussed in the works of Fistenberg-Eden & Eden, Ur & Brown and Cady.

== Principle of operation ==
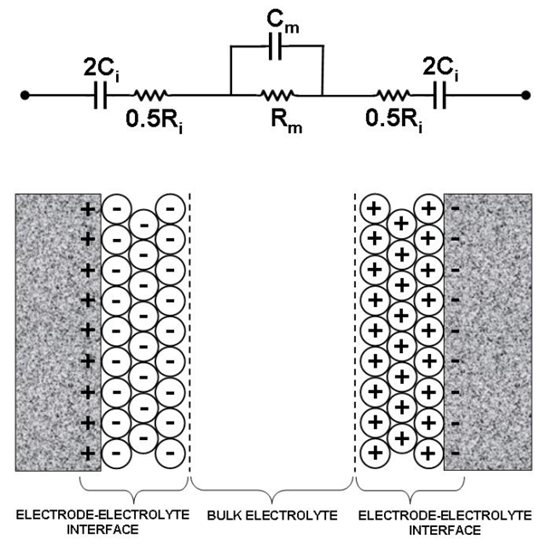
Figure 1: Equivalent electrical circuit to model a couple of electrodes in direct contact with a liquid medium

When a pair of electrodes are immersed in the growth medium, the system composed of electrodes and electrolyte can be modeled with the electrical circuit of Fig. 1, where R_{m} and C_{m} are the resistance and capacitance of the bulk medium, while R_{i} and C_{i} are the resistance and capacitance of the electrode-electrolyte interface. However, when frequency of the sinusoidal test signal applied to the electrodes is relatively low (lower than 1 MHz), the bulk capacitance C_{m} can be neglected, and the system can be modeled with a simpler circuit consisting only of a resistance R_{s} and a capacitance C_{s} in series. The resistance R_{s} accounts for the electrical conductivity of the bulk medium, while the capacitance C_{s} is due to the capacitive double-layer at the electrode-electrolyte interface. During the growth phase, bacterial metabolism transforms uncharged or weakly charged compounds of the bulk medium into highly charged compounds that change the electrical properties of the medium. This results in a decrease of resistance R_{s} and an increase of capacitance C_{s}.

In impedance microbiology, the technique works this way. The sample with the initial unknown bacterial concentration (C_{0}) is placed at a temperature favoring bacterial growth (in the range of 37 to 42 °C if a mesophilic microbial population is the target), and the electrical parameters R_{s} and C_{s} are measured at regular time intervals of a few minutes by means of a couple of electrodes in direct contact with the sample.

Until the bacterial concentration is lower than a critical threshold, C_{TH} the electrical parameters R_{s} and C_{s} remain essentially constant (at their baseline values). C_{TH} depends on various parameters such as electrode geometry, bacterial strain, chemical composition of the growth medium, etc., but it is always in the range of 10^{6} to 10^{7} cfu/ml.

When the bacterial concentration increases over C_{TH}, the electrical parameters deviate from their baseline values (generally in the case of bacteria there is a decrease of R_{s} and an increase of C_{s}; the opposite happens in the case of yeasts).

The time needed for the electrical parameters R_{s} and C_{s} to deviate from their baseline value is referred to as Detect Time (DT) and is the parameter used to estimate the initial unknown bacterial concentration C_{0}.

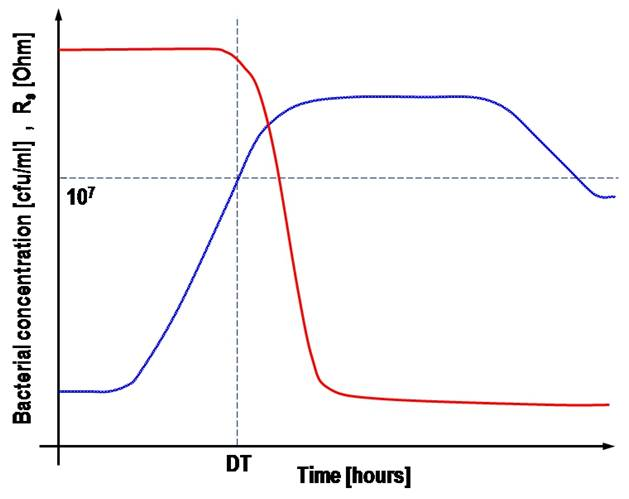
Figure 2: R_{s} curve and bacterial concentration curve as a function of time

In Fig. 2 a typical curve for R_{s} as well as the corresponding bacterial concentrations are plotted vs. time. Fig. 3 shows typical R_{s} curves vs time for samples characterized by different bacterial concentration. Since DT is the time needed for the bacterial concentration to grow from the initial value C_{0} to C_{TH}, highly contaminated samples are characterized by lower values of DT than samples with low bacterial concentration. Given C_{1}, C_{2} and C_{3} the bacterial concentrations of three samples with C_{1} > C_{2} > C_{3}, it is DT_{1} < DT_{2} < DT_{3}. Data from literature show how DT is a linear function of the logarithm of C_{0}:

$$DT = A\cdot\log_{10}(C_0) + B$$

where the parameters A and B are dependent on the particular type of samples under test, the bacterial strains, the type of enriching medium used, and so on. These parameters can be calculated by calibrating the system using a set of samples whose bacterial concentration is known and calculating the linear regression line that will be used to estimate the bacterial concentration from the measured DT.

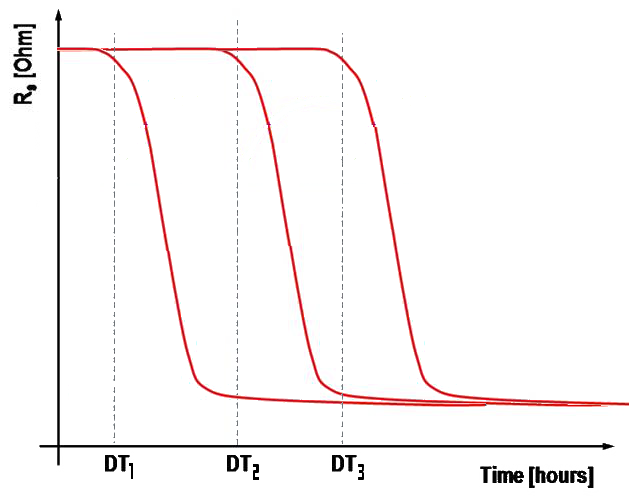
Figure 3: R_{s} curves for samples featuring different bacterial concentrations as a function of time

Impedance microbiology has different advantages over the standard plate count technique to measure bacterial concentration. It is characterized by faster response time. In the case of mesophilic bacteria, the response times range from 2 – 3 hours for highly contaminated samples (10^{5} - 10^{6} cfu/ml) to over 10 hours for samples with very low bacterial concentration (less than 10 cfu/ml). As a comparison, for the same bacterial strains, the Plate Count technique is characterized by response times from 48 to 72 hours.

Impedance microbiology is a method that can be easily automated and implemented as part of an industrial machine or realized as an embedded portable sensor, while plate count is a manual method that needs to be carried out in a laboratory by trained personnel.

== Instrumentation ==
Over the past decades different instruments (either laboratory built or commercially available) to measure bacterial concentration using impedance microbiology have been built. One of the best selling and well accepted instruments in the industry is the Bactometer by Biomerieux. The original instrument of 1984 features a multi-incubator system capable of monitoring up to 512 samples simultaneously with the ability to set 8 different incubation temperatures. Other instruments with performance comparable to the Bactometer are Malthus by Malthus Instruments Ltd (Bury, UK), RABIT by Don Whitley Scientific (Shipley, UK) and Bac Trac by Sy-Lab (Purkensdorf, Austria). A portable embedded system for microbial concentration measurement in liquid and semi-liquid media using impedance microbiology has been recently proposed. The system is composed of a thermoregulated incubation chamber where the sample under test is stored and a controller for thermoregulation and impedance measurements.

== Applications ==
Impedance microbiology has been extensively used in the past decades to measure the concentration of bacteria and yeasts in different types of samples, mainly for quality assurance in the food industry. Some applications are the determination of the shelf life of pasteurized milk and the measure of total bacterial concentration in raw-milk, frozen vegetables, grain products, meat products and beer. The technique has been also used in environmental monitoring to detect the coliform concentration in water samples as well as other bacterial pathogens like E.coli present in water bodies, in the pharmaceutical industry to test the efficiency of novel antibacterial agents and the testing of final products.
