= Electrochemiluminescence =

Emission of light from electrochemical reactions

Electrochemiluminescence or electrogenerated chemiluminescence (ECL) is a kind of luminescence produced during electrochemical reactions in solutions. In electrogenerated chemiluminescence, electrochemically generated intermediates undergo a highly exergonic reaction to produce an electronically excited state that then emits light upon relaxation to a lower-level state. This wavelength of the emitted photon of light corresponds to the energy gap between these two states. ECL excitation can be caused by energetic electron transfer (redox) reactions of electrogenerated species. Such luminescence excitation is a form of chemiluminescence where one/all reactants are produced electrochemically on the electrodes.

ECL is usually observed during application of potential (several volts) to electrodes of electrochemical cell that contains solution of luminescent species (polycyclic aromatic hydrocarbons, metal complexes, quantum dots or nanoparticles) in aprotic organic solvent (ECL composition). In organic solvents both oxidized and reduced forms of luminescent species can be produced at different electrodes simultaneously or at a single one by sweeping its potential between oxidation and reduction. The excitation energy is obtained from recombination of oxidized and reduced species.

In aqueous medium, which is mostly used for analytical applications, simultaneous oxidation and reduction of luminescent species is difficult to achieve due to electrochemical splitting of water itself so the ECL reaction with the coreactants is used. In the latter case luminescent species are oxidized at the electrode together with the coreactant which gives a strong reducing agent after some chemical transformations (the oxidative reduction mechanism).

Schematic representation of the "oxidative-reduction" heterogeneous ECL mechanisms for the couple Ru(bpy)_{3}^{2+}/TPrA. The ECL generation is obtained only by TPrA oxidation and involving the homogeneous reaction of the radical cation (TPrA°^{+}), as proposed by Bard. The luminophore in the excited state Ru^{2+}* relaxes to the ground state and emits photon. Inset image of electrode surface during an ECL emission

== Applications ==
ECL proved to be very useful in analytical applications as a highly sensitive and selective method. It combines analytical advantages of chemiluminescent analysis (absence of background optical signal) with ease of reaction control by applying electrode potential. As an analytical technique it presents outstanding advantages over other common analytical methods due to its versatility, simplified optical setup compared with photoluminescence (PL), and good temporal and spatial control compared with chemiluminescence (CL). Enhanced selectivity of ECL analysis is reached by variation of electrode potential thus controlling species that are oxidized/reduced at the electrode and take part in ECL reaction (see electrochemical analysis).

It generally uses Ruthenium complexes, especially [Ru(bpy)_{3}]^{2+} (bpy = 2,2'-bipyridine) which releases a photon at ~620 nm regenerating with TPrA (Tripropylamine) in liquid phase or liquid–solid interface. It can be used as monolayer immobilized on an electrode surface (made e.g. of nafion, or special thin films made by Langmuir–Blogett technique or self-assembly technique) or as a coreactant or more commonly as a tag and used in HPLC, Ru tagged antibody based immunoassays, Ru Tagged DNA probes for PCR etc., NADH or H_{2}O_{2} generation based biosensors, oxalate and organic amine detection and many other applications and can be detected from picomolar sensitivity to dynamic range of more than six orders of magnitude. Photon detection is done with photomultiplier tubes (PMT) or silicon photodiode or gold coated fiber-optic sensors. The importance of ECL techniques detection for bio-related applications has been well established. ECL is heavily used commercially for many clinical lab applications.

== See also ==
- Biosensors – Probe which tests for biological molecules
- Chemiluminescence – Emission of light as a result of a chemical reaction
- Electrochemistry – Branch of physical chemistry
- Galvanoluminescence – Light produced by passing electric current through an appropriate electrolyte
- Luminescence – Spontaneous emission of light by a substance
