= Ars operon =

Anion-transporting ATPase

Identifiers
- Symbol: ArsA_ATPase
- Pfam: PF02374
- Pfam clan: CL0023
- SCOP2: 1f48 / SCOPe / SUPFAM
- TCDB: 3.A.4
Available protein structures:
- PDB: PF02374 (ECOD; PDBsum)
- AlphaFold: PF02374

ArsB

Identifiers
- Symbol: ArsB
- Pfam: PF02040
- Pfam clan: CL0182
- InterPro: IPR000802
- TCDB: 3.A.4
Available protein structures:
- PDB: IPR000802 PF02040 (ECOD; PDBsum)
- AlphaFold: IPR000802; PF02040

ArsC
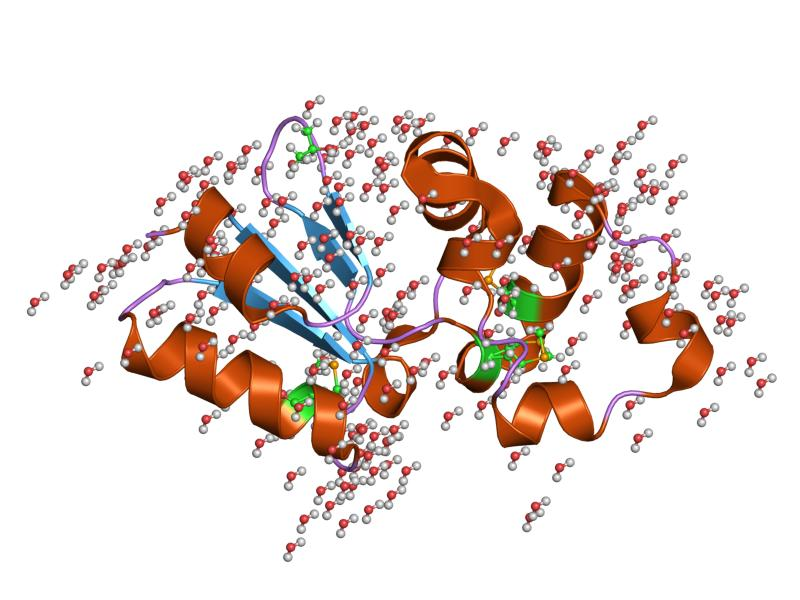
- yffb (pa3664) protein

Identifiers
- Symbol: ArsC
- Pfam: PF03960
- Pfam clan: CL0172
- InterPro: IPR006660
- SCOP2: 1i9d / SCOPe / SUPFAM
Available protein structures:
- PDB: IPR006660 PF03960 (ECOD; PDBsum)
- AlphaFold: IPR006660; PF03960

ArsD

Identifiers
- Symbol: ArsD
- Pfam: PF06953
- Pfam clan: CL0172
- InterPro: IPR010712
Available protein structures:
- PDB: IPR010712 PF06953 (ECOD; PDBsum)
- AlphaFold: IPR010712; PF06953

ArsR

Identifiers
- Symbol: ArsR
- Pfam: PF09824
- Pfam clan: CL0123
- InterPro: IPR018334
- SCOP2: a.4.5.5 / SCOPe / SUPFAM
Available protein structures:
- PDB: IPR018334 PF09824 (ECOD; PDBsum)
- AlphaFold: IPR018334; PF09824

In molecular biology, the ars operon is an operon found in several bacterial taxon. It is required for the detoxification of arsenate, arsenite, and antimonite. This system transports arsenite and antimonite out of the cell. The pump is composed of two polypeptides, the products of the arsA and arsB genes. This two-subunit enzyme produces resistance to arsenite and antimonite. Arsenate, however, must first be reduced to arsenite before it is extruded. A third gene, arsC, expands the substrate specificity to allow for arsenate pumping and resistance. ArsC is an approximately 150-residue arsenate reductase that uses reduced glutathione (GSH) to convert arsenate to arsenite with a redox active cysteine residue in the active site. ArsC forms an active quaternary complex with GSH, arsenate, and glutaredoxin 1 (Grx1). The three ligands must be present simultaneously for reduction to occur.

== ArsA and ArsB ==
ArsA and ArsB form an anion-translocating ATPase. The ArsB protein is distinguished by its overall hydrophobic character, in keeping with its role as a membrane-associated channel. Sequence analysis reveals the presence of 13 putative transmembrane (TM) regions.

== ArsC ==
The arsC protein structure has been solved. It belongs to the thioredoxin superfamily fold which is defined by a beta-sheet core surrounded by alpha-helices. The active cysteine residue of ArsC is located in the loop between the first beta-strand and the first helix, which is also conserved in the Spx protein and its homologues.

The arsC family also comprises the Spx proteins which are Gram-positive bacterial transcription factors that regulate the transcription of multiple genes in response to disulphide stress.

== ArsD and ArsR ==
ArsD is a trans-acting repressor of the arsRDABC operon that confers resistance to arsenicals and antimonials in Escherichia coli. It possesses two-pairs of vicinal cysteine residues, Cys(12)-Cys(13) and Cys(112)-Cys(113), that potentially form separate binding sites for the metalloids that trigger dissociation of ArsD from the operon. However, as a homodimer it has four vicinal cysteine pairs. The ArsD family consists of several bacterial arsenical resistance operon trans-acting repressor ArsD proteins.

ArsR is a trans-acting regulatory protein. It acts as a repressor on the arsRDABC operon when no arsenic is present in the cell. When arsenic is present in the cell ArsR will lose affinity for the operator and RNA polymerase can transcribe the arsDCAB genes. ArsD and ArsR work together to regulate the ars operon.

arsenic chaperone, ArsD, encoded by the arsRDABC operon of Escherichia coli. ArsD transfers trivalent metalloids to ArsA, the catalytic subunit of an As(III)/Sb(III) efflux pump. Interaction with ArsD increases the affinity of ArsA for arsenite, thus increasing its ATPase activity at lower concentrations of arsenite and enhancing the rate of arsenite extrusion.
