= Methods to investigate protein–protein interactions =

Molecular biology techniques

There are many methods to investigate protein–protein interactions which are the physical contacts of high specificity established between two or more protein molecules. This process typically involves electrostatic forces and hydrophobic effects. Each of the approaches has its own strengths and weaknesses, especially with regard to the sensitivity and specificity of the method. A high sensitivity means that many of the interactions that occur are detected by the screen. A high specificity indicates that most of the interactions detected by the screen are occurring in reality.

== Biochemical methods ==
Co-immunoprecipitation is considered to be the gold standard assay for protein–protein interactions, especially when it is performed with endogenous (not overexpressed and not tagged) proteins. The protein of interest is isolated with a specific antibody. Interaction partners which stick to this protein are subsequently identified by Western blotting. Interactions detected by this approach are considered to be real. However, this method can only verify interactions between suspected interaction partners. Thus, it is not a screening approach. A note of caution also is that immunoprecipitation experiments reveal direct and indirect interactions. Thus, positive results may indicate that two proteins interact directly or may interact via one or more bridging molecules. This could include bridging proteins, nucleic acids (DNA or RNA), or other molecules.

Bimolecular fluorescence complementation (BiFC) is a new technique in observing the interactions of proteins. Combining with other new techniques, this method can be used to screen protein–protein interactions and their modulators, DERB.

Affinity electrophoresis as used for estimation of binding constants, as for instance in lectin affinity electrophoresis or characterization of molecules with specific features like glycan content or ligand binding.

Pull-down assays are a common variation of immunoprecipitation and immunoelectrophoresis and are used identically, although this approach is more amenable to an initial screen for interacting proteins.

Label transfer can be used for screening or confirmation of protein interactions and can provide information about the interface where the interaction takes place. Label transfer can also detect weak or transient interactions that are difficult to capture using other in vitro detection strategies. In a label transfer reaction, a known protein is tagged with a detectable label. The label is then passed to an interacting protein, which can then be identified by the presence of the label.

Phage display is used for the high-throughput screening of protein interactions.

In-vivo crosslinking of protein complexes using photo-reactive amino acid analogs was introduced in 2005 by researchers from the Max Planck Institute In this method, cells are grown with photoreactive diazirine analogs to leucine and methionine, which are incorporated into proteins. Upon exposure to ultraviolet light, the diazirines are activated and bind to interacting proteins that are within a few angstroms of the photo-reactive amino acid analog.

Tandem affinity purification (TAP) method allows high throughput identification of protein interactions. In contrast to yeast two-hybrid approach the accuracy of the method can be compared to those of small-scale experiments and the interactions are detected within the correct cellular environment as by co-immunoprecipitation. However, the TAP tag method requires two successive steps of protein purification and consequently it can not readily detect transient protein–protein interactions. Recent genome-wide TAP experiments were performed by Krogan et al. and Gavin et al. providing updated protein interaction data for yeast organism.

Chemical cross-linking is often used to "fix" protein interactions in place before trying to isolate/identify interacting proteins. Common crosslinkers for this application include the non-cleavable NHS-ester cross-linker, bissulfosuccinimidyl suberate (BS3); a cleavable version of BS3, dithiobis(sulfosuccinimidyl propionate) (DTSSP); and the imidoester cross-linker dimethyl dithiobispropionimidate (DTBP) that is popular for fixing interactions in ChIP assays.

Chemical cross-linking followed by high mass MALDI mass spectrometry can be used to analyze intact protein interactions in place before trying to isolate/identify interacting proteins. This method detects interactions among non-tagged proteins and is available from CovalX.

SPINE (Strepprotein interaction experiment) uses a combination of reversible crosslinking with formaldehyde and an incorporation of an affinity tag to detect interaction partners in vivo.

Quantitative immunoprecipitation combined with knock-down (QUICK) relies on co-immunoprecipitation, quantitative mass spectrometry (SILAC) and RNA interference (RNAi). This method detects interactions among endogenous non-tagged proteins. Thus, it has the same high confidence as co-immunoprecipitation. However, this method also depends on the availability of suitable antibodies.

Proximity ligation assay (PLA) in situ is an immunohistochemical method utilizing so called PLA probes for detection of proteins, protein interactions and modifications. Each PLA probes comes with a unique short DNA strand attached to it and bind either to species specific primary antibodies or consist of directly DNA-labeled primary antibodies. When the PLA probes are in close proximity, the DNA strands can interact through a subsequent addition of two other circle-forming DNA oligonucleotides. After joining of the two added oligonucleotides by enzymatic ligation, they are amplified via rolling circle amplification using a polymerase. After the amplification reaction, several-hundredfold replication of the DNA circle has occurred and fluorophore or enzyme labeled complementary oligonucleotide probes highlight the product. The resulting high concentration of fluorescence or cromogenic signal in each single-molecule amplification product is easily visible as a distinct bright spot when viewed with either in a fluorescence microscope or a standard brightfield microscope.

== Biophysical and theoretical methods ==
Surface plasmon resonance (SPR) is the most common label-free technique for the measurement of biomolecular interactions. SPR instruments measure the change in the refractive index of light reflected from a metal surface (the "biosensor"). Binding of biomolecules to the other side of this surface leads to a change in the refractive index which is proportional to the mass added to the sensor surface. In a typical application, one binding partner (the "ligand", often a protein) is immobilized on the biosensor and a solution with potential binding partners (the "analyte") is channelled over this surface. The build-up of analyte over time allows to quantify on rates (k_{on}), off rates (k_{off}), dissociation constants (K_{d}) and, in some applications, active concentrations of the analyte. Several different vendors offer SPR-based devices. Best known are Biacore instruments which were the first commercially available.

Dual polarisation interferometry (DPI) can be used to measure protein–protein interactions. DPI provides real-time, high-resolution measurements of molecular size, density and mass. While tagging is not necessary, one of the protein species must be immobilized on the surface of a waveguide. As well as kinetics and affinity, conformational changes during interaction can also be quantified.

Static light scattering (SLS) measures changes in the Rayleigh scattering of protein complexes in solution and can characterize both weak and strong interactions without labeling or immobilization of the proteins or other biomacromolecule. The composition-gradient, multi-angle static light scattering (CG-MALS) measurement mixes a series of aliquots of different concentrations or compositions, measures the effect of the changes in light scattering as a result of the interaction, and fits the correlated light scattering changes with concentration to a series of association models in order to find the best-fit descriptor. Weak, non-specific interactions are typically characterized via the second virial coefficient. For specific binding, this type of analysis can determine the stoichiometry and equilibrium association constant(s) of one or more associated complexes, including challenging systems such as those that exhibit simultaneous homo- and hetero-association, multi-valent interactions and cooperativity.

Dynamic light scattering (DLS), also known as quasielastic light scattering (QELS), or photon correlation spectroscopy, processes the time-dependent fluctuations in scattered light intensity to yield the hydrodynamic radius of particles in solution. The hydrodynamic radius is the radius of a solid sphere with the same translational diffusion coefficient as that measured for the sample particle. As proteins associate, the average hydrodynamic radius of the solution increases. Application of the Method of Continuous Variation, otherwise known as the Job plot, with the solution hydrodynamic radius as the observable, enables in vitro determination of K_{d}, complex stoichiometry, complex hydrodynamic radius, and the ΔH° and ΔS° of protein–protein interactions. This technique does not entail immobilization or labeling. Transient and weak interactions can be characterized. Relative to static light scattering, which is based upon the absolute intensity of scattered light, DLS is insensitive to background light from the walls of containing structures. This insensitivity permits DLS measurements from 1 μL volumes in 1536 well plates, and lowers sample requirements into the femtomole range. This technique is also suitable for screening of buffer components and/or small molecule inhibitors/effectors.

Flow-induced dispersion analysis (FIDA), is a new capillary-based and immobilization-free technology used for characterization and quantification of biomolecular interaction and protein concentration under native conditions. The technique is based on measuring the change in apparent size (hydrodynamic radius) of a selective ligand when interacting with the analyte of interest. A FIDA assay works in complex solutions (e.g. plasma, serum, lysate), and provides information regarding analyte concentration, affinity constants, molecular size, binding kinetics, aggregation. A single assay is typically completed in minutes and only requires a sample consumption of a few μL. It can be used as a self-sufficient method, or in a workflow with SPR, to de-risk and speed up SPR assays. In terms of novel applications, it is used for de novo protein screening. In terms of traditional applications it is e.g. used for interaction studies across membrane proteins and antibodies.

Fluorescence polarization/anisotropy can be used to measure protein–protein or protein–ligand interactions. Typically one binding partner is labeled with a fluorescence probe (although sometimes intrinsic protein fluorescence from tryptophan can be used) and the sample is excited with polarized light. The increase in the polarization of the fluorescence upon binding of the labeled protein to its binding partner can be used to calculate the binding affinity.

With fluorescence correlation spectroscopy, one protein is labeled with a fluorescent dye and the other is left unlabeled. The two proteins are then mixed and the data outputs the fraction of the labeled protein that is unbound and bound to the other protein, allowing you to get a measure of K_{D} and binding affinity. You can also take time-course measurements to characterize binding kinetics. FCS also tells you the size of the formed complexes so you can measure the stoichiometry of binding. A more powerful methods is fluorescence cross-correlation spectroscopy (FCCS) that employs double labeling techniques and cross-correlation resulting in vastly improved signal-to-noise ratios over FCS. Furthermore, the two-photon and three-photon excitation practically eliminates photobleaching effects and provide ultra-fast recording of FCCS or FCS data.

Fluorescence resonance energy transfer (FRET) is a common technique when observing the interactions of only two different proteins.

Bio-layer interferometry (BLI) is a label-free technology for measuring biomolecular interactions (protein:protein or protein:small molecule). It is an optical analytical technique that analyzes the interference pattern of white light reflected from two surfaces: a layer of immobilized protein on the biosensor tip, and an internal reference layer. Any change in the number of molecules bound to the biosensor tip causes a shift in the interference pattern that can be measured in real-time, providing detailed information regarding the kinetics of association and dissociation of the two molecules as well as the affinity constant for the protein interaction (k_{a}, k_{d} and K_{d}). Due to sensor configuration, the technique is highly amenable to both purified and crude samples as well as high throughput screening experiments. The detection method can also be used to determine the molar concentration of analytes.

Protein activity determination by NMR multi-nuclear relaxation measurements, or 2D-FT NMR spectroscopy in solutions, combined with nonlinear regression analysis of NMR relaxation or 2D-FT spectroscopy data sets. Whereas the concept of water activity is widely known and utilized in the applied biosciences, its complement—the protein activity which quantitates protein–protein interactions—is much less familiar to bioscientists as it is more difficult to determine in dilute solutions of proteins; protein activity is also much harder to determine for concentrated protein solutions when protein aggregation, not merely transient protein association, is often the dominant process.

Isothermal titration calorimetry (ITC), is considered as the most quantitative technique available for measuring the thermodynamic properties of protein–protein interactions and is becoming a necessary tool for protein–protein complex structural studies. This technique relies upon the accurate measurement of heat changes that follow the interaction of protein molecules in solution, without the need to label or immobilize the binding partners, since the absorption or production of heat is an intrinsic property of virtually all biochemical reactions. ITC provides information regarding the stoichiometry, enthalpy, entropy, and binding kinetics between two interacting proteins.

Microscale thermophoresis (MST), is a new method that enables the quantitative analysis of molecular interactions in solution at the microliter scale. The technique is based on the thermophoresis of molecules, which provides information about molecule size, charge and hydration shell. Since at least one of these parameters is typically affected upon binding, the method can be used for the analysis of each kind of biomolecular interaction or modification. The method works equally well in standard buffers and biological liquids like blood or cell-lysate. It is a free solution method which does not need to immobilize the binding partners. MST provides information regarding the binding affinity, stoichiometry, competition and enthalpy of two or more interacting proteins.

Rotating cell‑based ligand binding assay using radioactivity or fluorescence, is a recent method that measures molecular interactions in living cells in real-time. This method allows the characterization of the binding mechanism, as well as K_{d}, k_{on} and k_{off}. This principle is being applied in several studies, mainly with protein ligands and living mammalian cells. An alternative technology to measure protein interactions directly on cells is Real-Time Interaction Cytometry (RT-IC). In this technology, the living or fixed cells are physically retained on the surface of biosensor chips using biocompatible and flow-permeable polymer traps. Binding and unbinding of automatically injected labeled analytes is measured by time-resolved fluorescence detection.

Single colour reflectometry (SCORE) is a label-free technology for measuring all kinds of biomolecular interactions in real-time. Similar to BLI, it exploits interference effects at thin layers. However, it does not need a spectral resolution but rather uses monochromatic light. Thus, it is possible to analyse not only a single interaction but high-density arrays with up to 10,000 interactions per cm^{2}.

switchSENSE is a technology based on DNA nanolevers on a chip surface. A fluorescent dye as well as the unlabeled ligand are attached to this nanolever. Upon binding of an analyte to the ligand, the real-time kinetic rates (k_{on}, k_{off}) can be measured as changes in fluorescence intensity and the K_{d} can be derived. This method can be used to investigate protein-protein interactions, as well as to investigate modulators of protein-protein interactions by assessing ternary complex formation. An example for such modulators are PROTACs, which are investigated for their therapeutic potential in cancer therapy. Another example for such ternary interactions are bispecific antibodies binding to their two distinct antigens. switchSENSE can additionally be utilized to detect conformational changes induced by ligands binding to a target protein.

== Genetic methods ==
The yeast two-hybrid and bacterial two-hybrid assays investigate interactions between artificial fusion proteins. They do not require isolation of proteins but rather use transformation to express proteins in yeast or bacteria, respectively. The cells are designed in a way that an interaction activates the transcription of a reporter gene or a reporter enzyme. These methods allow easy screening of interactions and libraries with high throughput (see two-hybrid screening).

== Computational methods ==
Most PPI methods require some computational data analysis. The methods in this section are primarily computational although they typically require data generated by wet lab experiments.

Protein–protein docking, the prediction of protein–protein interactions based only on the three-dimensional protein structures from X-ray diffraction of protein crystals might not be satisfactory.

Network analysis includes the analysis of interaction networks using methods of graph theory or statistical methods. The goal of these studies is to understand the nature of interactions in the context of a cell or pathway, not just individual interactions.
