= Avidity =

Type of affinity in biochemistry

In biochemistry, avidity refers to the accumulated strength of multiple affinities of individual non-covalent binding interactions, such as between a protein receptor and its ligand, and is commonly referred to as functional affinity. Avidity differs from affinity, which describes the strength of a single interaction. However, because individual binding events increase the likelihood of occurrence of other interactions (i.e., increase the local concentration of each binding partner in proximity to the binding site), avidity should not be thought of as the mere sum of its constituent affinities but as the combined effect of all affinities participating in the biomolecular interaction. A particular important aspect relates to the phenomenon of 'avidity entropy' - the multiple different affinities that could potentially form within a binding interaction, each configuration producing different avidity. Biomolecules often form heterogenous complexes or homogeneous oligomers and multimers or polymers. If clustered proteins form an organized matrix, such as the clathrin-coat, the interaction is described as a matricity.

== Antibody-antigen interaction ==
Avidity is commonly applied to antibody interactions in which multiple antigen-binding sites simultaneously interact with the target antigenic epitopes, often in multimerized structures. Individually, each binding interaction may be readily broken; however, when many binding interactions are present at the same time, transient unbinding of a single site does not allow the molecule to diffuse away, and binding of that weak interaction is likely to be restored.

Each antibody has at least two antigen-binding sites, therefore antibodies are bivalent to multivalent. Avidity (functional affinity) is the accumulated strength of multiple affinities. For example, IgM is said to have low affinity but high avidity because it has 10 weak binding sites for antigen as opposed to the 2 stronger binding sites of IgG, IgE and IgD with higher single binding affinities.

=== Affinity ===
Binding affinity is a measure of dynamic equilibrium of the ratio of on-rate (k_{on}) and off-rate (k_{off}) under specific concentrations of reactants. The affinity constant, K_{a}, is the inverse of the dissociation constant, K_{d}. The strength of complex formation in solution is related to the stability constants of complexes, however in case of large biomolecules, such as receptor-ligand pairs, their interaction is also dependent on other structural and thermodynamic properties of reactants plus their orientation and immobilization.

There are several methods to investigate protein–protein interactions existing with differences in immobilization of each reactant in 2D or 3D orientation. The measured affinities are stored in public databases, such as the Ki Database and BindingDB. As an example, affinity is the binding strength between the complex structures of the epitope of antigenic determinant and paratope of antigen-binding site of an antibody. Participating non-covalent interactions may include hydrogen bonds, electrostatic bonds, van der Waals forces and hydrophobic effects.

Calculation of binding affinity for bimolecular reaction (1 antibody binding site per 1 antigen):

$$\ce{[Ab] + [Ag] <=> [AbAg]}$$

where [Ab] is the antibody concentration and [Ag] is the antigen concentration, either in free ([Ab],[Ag]) or bound ([AbAg]) state.

calculation of association constant (or equilibrium constant):

$$K_a = \frac{k_\ce{on}}{k_\ce{off}} = \frac\ce{[AbAg]}\ce{[Ab][Ag]}$$

calculation of dissociation constant:

$$K_d = \frac{k_\ce{off}}{k_\ce{on}} = \frac\ce{[Ab][Ag]}\ce{[AbAg]}$$

== Application ==
Avidity tests for rubella virus, Toxoplasma gondii, cytomegalovirus (CMV), varicella zoster virus, human immunodeficiency virus (HIV), hepatitis viruses, Epstein–Barr virus, and others were developed a few years ago. These tests help to distinguish acute, recurrent or past infection by avidity of marker-specific IgG. Currently there are two avidity assays in use. These are the well known chaotropic (conventional) assay and the recently developed AVIcomp (avidity competition) assay.

== See also ==
- Amino acid residue
- Epitope
- Fab region
- Hapten

A number of technologies exist to characterise the avidity of molecular interactions including switchSENSE and surface plasmon resonance.
