= FIDA =

FIDA may refer to:

Acronyms

- Federación Internacional de Abogadas (International Federation of Women Lawyers)
- Flow-induced dispersion analysis, a method for the characterization of biomolecular interactions
- International Fund for Agricultural Development (Fonds international de développement agricole)
- Islamic Front for Armed Jihad (Front Islamique du Djihad Armé), an organization during the Algerian Civil War
- Palestinian Democratic Union (Al-Ittihad al-Dimuqrati al-Filastini)
- Federal Independent Democratic Alliance, a front organization used by South Africa's apartheid-era government

Other uses

- Fida, a 2004 Indian Hindi film
- Fidaa, a 2017 Indian film by Shekhar Kammula
- Fidaa (2018 film), an Indian film
- Fida International, Finnish non-governmental humanitarian organization
- Fida (name), an Arabic given name

== See also ==
- Fedayi (disambiguation)
