= Matrix (biology) =

Material or tissue between a eukaryotic organism's cells

In biology, matrix (pl.: matrices) is the material (or tissue) in between cells within a eukaryotic organism.

The structure of connective tissues is an extracellular matrix. Fingernails and toenails grow from matrices. It is found in various connective tissues. It serves as a jelly-like structure instead of cytoplasm in connective tissue.

== Tissue matrices ==
=== Extracellular matrix (ECM) ===
The main ingredients of the extracellular matrix are glycoproteins secreted by the cells. The most abundant glycoprotein in the ECM of most animal cells is collagen, which forms strong fibers outside the cells. In fact, collagen accounts for about 40% of the total protein in the human body. The collagen fibers are embedded in a network woven from proteoglycans. A proteoglycan molecule consists of a small core protein with many carbohydrate chains covalently attached, so that it may be up to 95% carbohydrate. Large proteoglycan complexes can form when hundreds of proteoglycans become noncovalently attached to a single long polysaccharide molecule. Some cells are attached to the ECM by still other ECM glycoproteins such as fibronectin. Fibronectin and other ECM proteins bind to cell surface receptor proteins called integrins that are built into the plasma membrane. Integrins span the membrane and bind on the cytoplasmic side to associated proteins attached to microfilaments of the cytoskeleton. The name integrin is based on the word integrate, integrins are in a position to transmit signals between the ECM and the cytoskeleton and thus to integrate changes occurring outside and inside the cell. Current research on fibronectin, other ECM molecules, and integrins is revealing the influential role of the ECM in the lives of cells. By communicating with a cell through integrins, the ECM can regulate a cell's behavior. For example, some cells in a developing embryo migrate along specific pathways by matching the orientation of their microfilaments to the "grain" of fibers in the ECM. Researchers are also learning that the ECM around a cell can influence the activity of genes in the nucleus. Information about the ECM probably reaches the nucleus by a combination of mechanical and chemical signaling pathways. Mechanical signaling involves fibronectin, integrins, and microfilaments of the cytoskeleton. Changes in the cytoskeleton may in turn trigger chemical signaling pathways inside the cell, leading to changes in the set of proteins being made by the cell and therefore changes in the cells function. In this way, the ECM of a particular tissue may help coordinate the behavior of all the cells within that tissue. Direct connections between cells also function in this coordination.

=== Bone matrix ===
Bone is a form of connective tissue found in the body, composed largely of hardened hydroxyapatite-containing collagen. In larger mammals, it is arranged in osteon regions. Bone matrix allows mineral salts such as calcium to be stored and provides protection for internal organs and support for locomotion.

=== Cartilage matrix ===
Cartilage is another form of connective tissue found in the body, providing a smooth surface for joints and a mechanism for growth of bones during development.

== Subcellular matrices ==
=== Mitochondrial matrix ===
In the mitochondrion, the matrix contains soluble enzymes that catalyze the oxidation of pyruvate and other small organic molecules.

=== Nuclear matrix ===
In the cell nucleus the matrix is the insoluble fraction that remains after extracting the solubled DNA.

=== Golgi matrix ===
The Golgi matrix is a protein scaffold around the Golgi apparatus made up of Golgins, GRASP's and miscellaneous other proteins on the cytoplasmic side of the Golgi apparatus involved in keeping its shape and membrane stacking.

== Matrix (medium) ==
A matrix is also a medium in which bacteria are grown (cultured). For instance, a Petri dish of agar may be the matrix for culturing a sample swabbed from a patient's throat.

== See also ==
- Matricity

=== Tissues and cells ===
- Germinal matrix
- Hair matrix cell

=== Molecular biology ===
- Matrix attachment region
- Matrix metalloproteinase
- Matrix protein

=== Bioinformatics and sequence evolution ===
- PAM matrix
- Position-specific scoring matrix
- Similarity matrix
- Substitution matrix

=== Botany and agriculture ===
- Matrix Planting

=== Population biology and ecology ===
- Matrix population models
