= Biacore =

Life science products company

Biacore, AB
- Founded: 1984
- Headquarters: Uppsala, Sweden
- Area served: Worldwide
- Website: www.cytiva.com/Biacore

Biacore was a life science products company based in Sweden. In June 2006 Biacore was sold for $390 million and became a product brand under GE Healthcare life Sciences, which became Cytiva in April 2020.

Biacore products measure biomolecular interactions, including protein-protein interactions, small molecule/fragment-protein interactions, etc. Its technology is often used to measure not only binding affinities, but kinetic rate constants and thermodynamics as well. The technology is based on surface plasmon resonance (SPR), an optical phenomenon that enables detection of unlabeled interactants in real time. The SPR-based biosensors can be used in determination of active concentration as well as characterization of molecular interactions in terms of both affinity and chemical kinetics.

== History ==
Biacore was founded in 1984 under the name of Pharmacia Biosensor AB, by researchers from Pharmacia, Linköping Institute of Technology and the Swedish National Defence Research Institute (FOA, now renamed the Swedish Defence Research Agency or FOI). The first Biacore SPR instrument was commercially released in 1990. In 1996 the company changed its name to Biacore AB Corporation.

== Technology ==
A simple interaction experiment involves immobilizing one molecule of a binding pair on the sensor chip surface ("ligand", in Biacore parlance) and injecting a series of concentrations of its partner ("analyte") across the surface. Changes in the index of refraction at the surface where the binding interaction occurs are detected by the hardware and recorded as RU (resonance units) in the control software. Curves are generated from the RU trace and are evaluated by fitting algorithms which compare the raw data to well-defined binding models. These fits allow determination of a variety of thermodynamic constants, including the apparent affinity of the binding interaction. SPR is one of many methods for protein-protein and protein-ligand interaction assessment, see Methods to investigate protein–protein interactions.
