= KIDB =

KIDB may refer to:

- KIDB-LD, a defunct low-power television station (channel 35) formerly licensed to serve Sweetwater, Texas, United States
- Ki Database
