= Focal molography =

Focal molography ("molography" in short) is a biophysical method for robust and sensitive detection of biomolecular interactions in a label-free manner. The new method enables biomolecular interaction analysis in complex biological samples without the use of additional fluorescent labels. Molography widens the analytic scope of biomolecular interaction analysis techniques in a broad range of applications, e.g. label-free trace analysis of a targeted molecule (called biomarker) in complex samples, such as blood sera, bioreactor fluid or cell culture media. Contrary to refractometric methods for label-free biomolecular interaction analysis, such as surface plasmon resonance (SPR) and reflectometric interference spectroscopy (RIfS), focal molography allows quantification of molecular interactions in living cells in real time.

== Principle ==
The working principle of molography is illustrated in Figure 1. Molography is based on diffraction of laser light at a special 2D nanopattern of molecular binding sites on the surface of a sensor chip, termed mologram. A mologram is a coherent assembly of binding sites on a chip that form the blueprint of molecular hologram. The hologram has the shape of a focusing diffractive lens and is illuminated by an evanescent wave. Evanescent waves occur when light is totally internally reflected at an interface of two dielectrics. Biomolecules that bind to the mologram diffract laser light into a diffraction-limited focal spot in three dimensional space, the focal point of the mologram. The intensity of the focused light correlates quadratically with the amount of bound molecules on the mologram and therefore also the number of biomolecular interactions that take place.

In complex biological samples, the concentration of off-target molecules is usually significantly higher than the target molecules. Therefore, even in the absence of recognition elements the off-target molecules readily adsorb to the surface of the sensor. However, this a random process and the off-target molecules do not bind to the ordered binding sites of the mologram. Thus, scattering of off-target molecules is uniform in all spatial directions and therefore off-target molecules hardly contribute to the measured light intensity in the narrow solid angle of the focal spot. In essence, focal molography forms a high-frequency spatial affinity lock-in that only measures the Fourier component of the refractive index distribution that corresponds to the binding modulation of the mologram. Since the environmental noise (temperature gradients, buffer changes and nonspecific binding of off-target molecules) is inversely proportional to the spatial frequency and therefore situated mostly at "long" spatial periods most of the noise can be rejected. This property makes molography extremely robust and renders temperature stabilization or sensor equilibration obsolete.

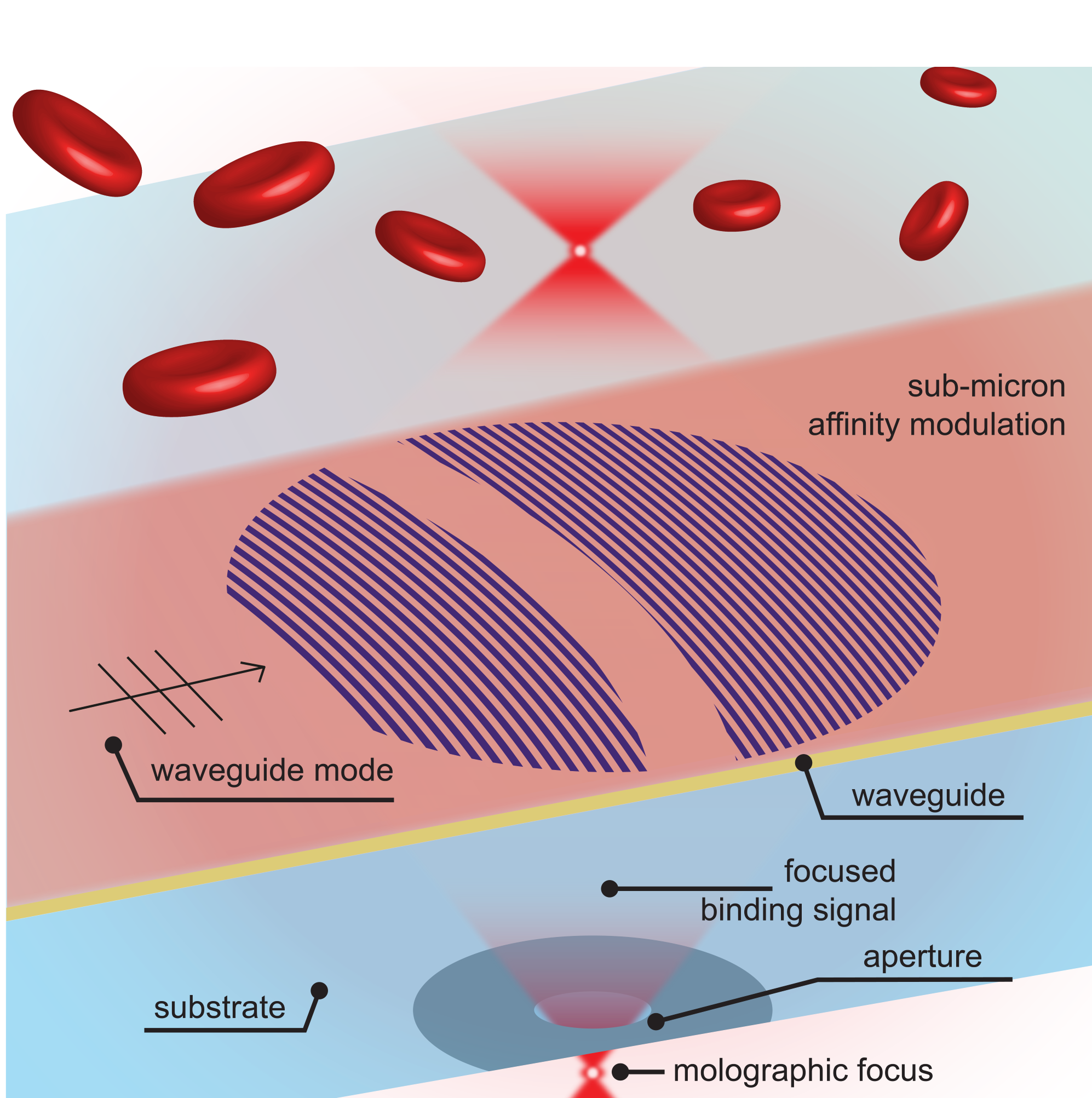
FIG. 1. Working principle of focal molography: A submicrometer affinity modulation formed by specific binders is exposed to a biological sample (e.g., blood). The mode of a high-refractive-index waveguide provides dark-field illumination of the molecules near the sensor surface and enhances the light intensity. The shape of the pattern acts as a diffractive lens, which concentrates the diffracted signal into a focal spot, whereas the background intensity is diluted over the entire solid angle. (Figure reproduced from )

== History ==
Christof Fattinger at Hoffmann-La-Roche in Basel already conceived the physical principles of focal molography in the 1990s when he investigated the bidiffractive grating-coupler. Yet it only emerged in a scientific collaboration between ETH Zürich and the Roche Innovation Center Basel in Switzerland from 2014 to 2020.

The synthesis of molograms on the sensor chip is realized with properly designed surface chemistry and reactive immersion lithography (RIL). Through the RIL process the biomolecular recognition structure of the mologram on a light-sensitive non-fouling graft copolymer layer can be created by standard lithography techniques. The copolymer layer is functionalized with photocleavable protection groups that upon illumination create reactive amines. Subsequent surface chemistry steps enable an easy tailoring of recognition molecules specific to the desired analytical application.

The robustness of focal molography against environmental noise gives the method a platform character that enables many possible applications. They range from the investigation of a specific biomolecular interaction in basic biological research to the diagnosis of a critical health condition in an emergency.

The biological applications of molography categorize into five basic classes:

1. Classical biomolecular interaction analysis (BIA), i.e. the measurement of on-rates, off-rates and binding constants as demonstrated in,
2. Quantification of biomarkers in biological samples,
3. Profiling of low-affinity binders on mologram arrays,
4. Quantification of molecular interactions in living cells in real time, and
5. Discovery of unknown biomolecular interactions by means of binding assays.

A 2025 study compared focal molography with surface plasmon resonance (SPR) for the binding of β-catenin, a target in cancer therapeutics, to a peptide derived from the transcription factor TCF4. In cell lysate, focal molography yielded a dissociation constant of 100 to 140 nM, consistent with the 96 to 121 nM determined by SPR in buffer, whereas SPR measurements in cell lysate gave no affinity information because of non-specific background binding.
