= Fida (name) =

- Gender: Female/Male

Origin
- Origin: Arabic

Fida (Arabic: فداء), is a masculine Arabic given name meaning redemption. Notable people with the name include:

== Given name ==
- Fida al-Sayed (born 1985), Syrian political activist
- Fida-Ur-Rehman Darkhawasti (1939–2020), Pakistani Islamic scholar
- Fida Hassnain (1924–2016), Kashmiri writer and Sufi mystic
- Fida Hussein (born 1946), Fiji Labour Party politician
- Fida Hussain Gadi, Seraiki intellectual
- Fida Hussain Malik, Pakistani general
- Fida M. Kamal, Bangladeshi lawyer
- Fida Mohammad Khan (1919–2007), Pakistani conservative economist and lawyer
- Fida Mohammad Khan (senator), Pakistani politician
- Fida Muhammad Nashad, Pakistani politician
- Fida Ur Rehman (born 1964), Pakistani footballer

== Films ==
- Fida - Bollywood film
- Fidaa - Telugu language film

External links

- Fida: Name Meaning and Origin
