= Single colour reflectometry =

Single colour reflectometry (SCORE), formerly known as imaging Reflectometric Interferometry (iRIf) and 1-lambda Reflectometry, is a physical method based on interference of monochromatic light at thin films, which is used to investigate (bio-)molecular interactions. The obtained binding curves using SCORE provide detailed information on kinetics and thermodynamics of the observed interaction(s) as well as on concentrations of the used analytes. These data can be relevant for pharmaceutical screening and drug design, biosensors and other biomedical applications, diagnostics, and cell-based assays.

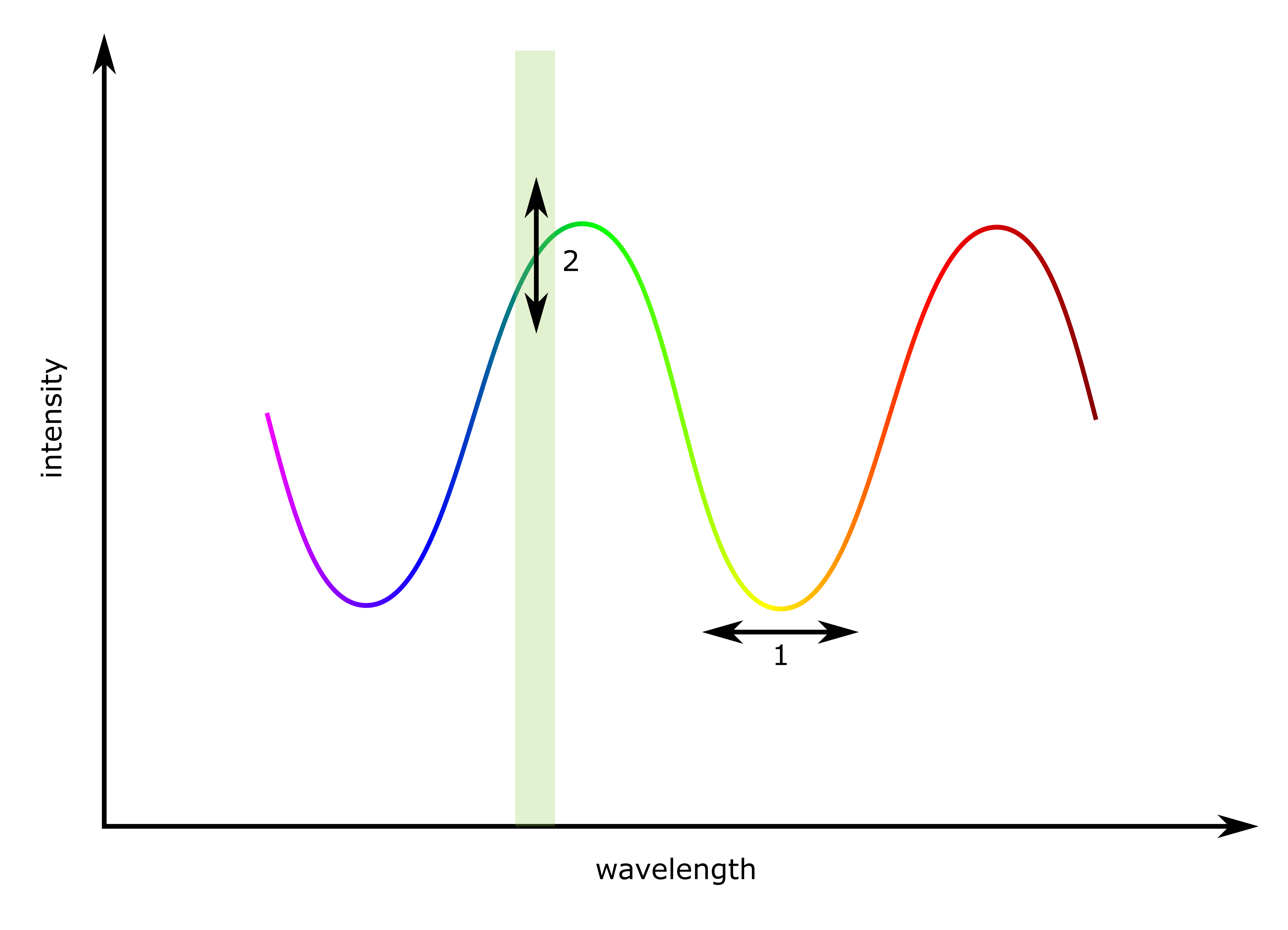
Reflectometry can be either realised by 1: monitoring the shift of an extremum in x-direction via a spectrometer (BLI, RIfS), or 2: monitoring the change in intensity of one wavelength in y-direction via a photodiode or camera (SCORE)

== Principle ==
The underlying principle corresponds to that of the Fabry-Pérot interferometer, which is also the underlying principle for the white-light interferometry.

== Realisation / setup ==
Monochromatic light is illuminated vertically on the rear side of a transparent multi-layer substrate. The partial beams of the monochromatic light are transmitted and reflected at each interphase of the multi-layer system. Superimposition of the reflected beams result in destructive or constructive interference (depending on wavelength of the used light and the used substrate/multi-layer system materials) that can be detected in an intensity change of the reflected light using a photodiode, CCD, or CMOS element.

The sensitive layer on top of the multi-layer system can be (bio-)chemically modified with receptor molecules, e.g. antibodies. Binding of specific ligands to the immobilised receptor molecules results in a change refractive index n and physical thickness d of the sensitive layer. The product of n and d results in the optical thickness (n*d) of the sensitive layer.

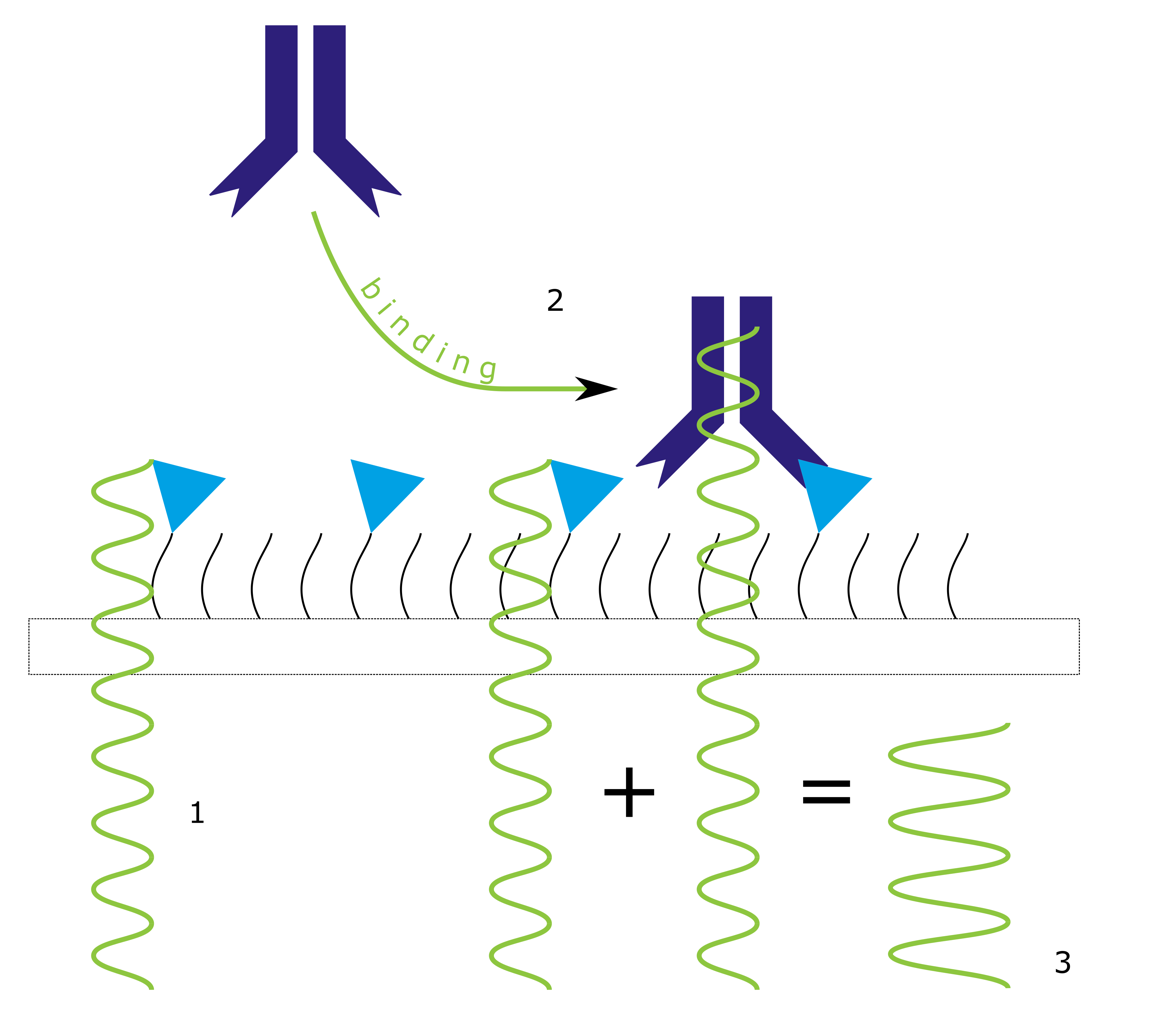
1: Monochromatic light is reflected at a biolayer interface, 2: upon binding the reflection conditions change, resulting in 3: a higher reflected intensity due to positive interference

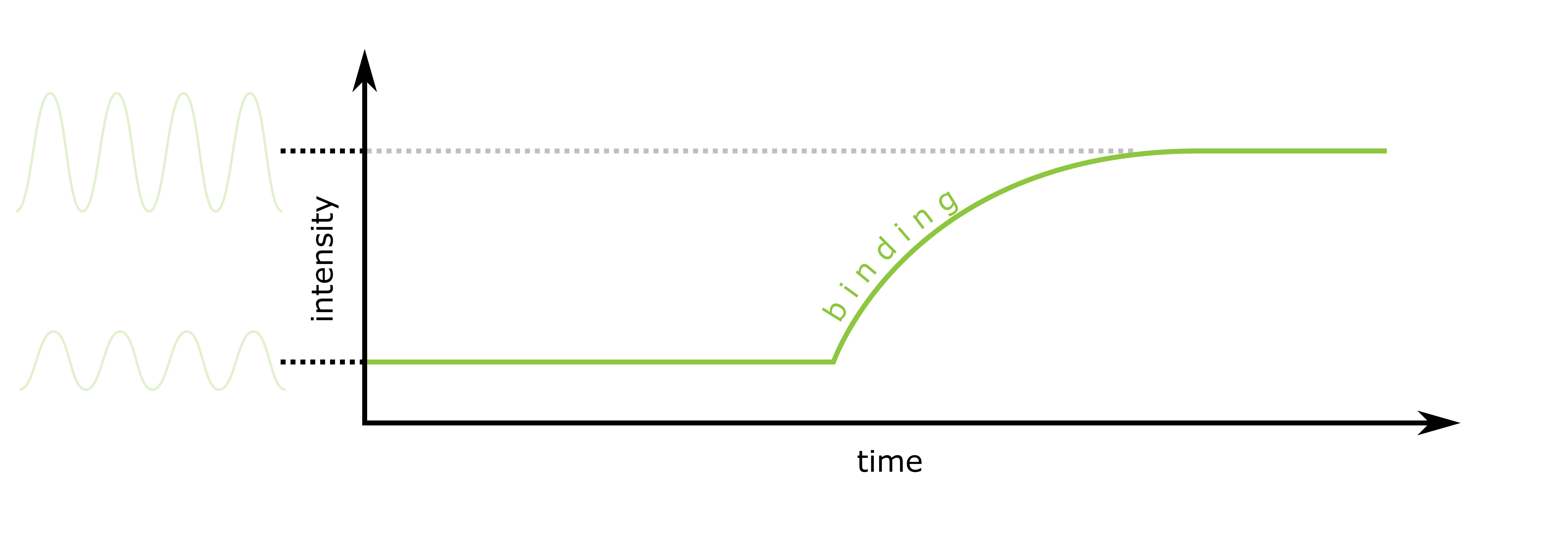
Example binding curve in an intensity vs time diagram

Monitoring the change of the reflected intensity of the used light over time results in binding curves that provide information on:

- concentration of used ligand
- binding kinetics (association and dissociation rate constants) between receptor and ligand
- binding strength (affinity) between receptor and ligand
- specificity of the interaction between receptor and ligand

Compared to bio-layer interferometry, which monitors the change of the interference pattern of reflected white light, SCORE only monitors the intensity change of the reflected light using a photodiode, CCD, or CMOS element. Thus, it is possible to analyse not only a single interaction but high-density arrays with up to 10,000 interactions per cm^{2}. Compared to surface plasmon resonance (SPR), which penetration depth is limited by the evanescent field, SCORE is limited by the coherence length of the light source, which is typically a few micrometers. This is especially relevant when investigating whole cell assays. Also, SCORE (as well as BLI) is not influenced by temperature fluctuations during the measurement, while SPR needs thermostabilisation.

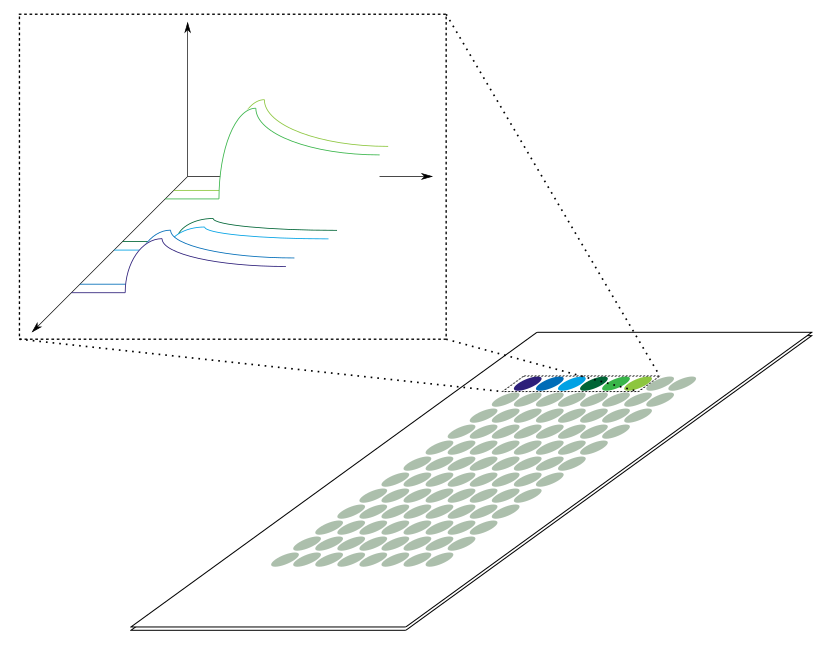
Multiplexed binding curves using an array format

== Application ==
SCORE is especially used as detection method in bio- and chemosensors. It is a label-free technique like Reflectometric interference spectroscopy (RIfS), Bio-layer Interferometry (BLI) and Surface plasmon resonance (SPR), which allows time-resolved observation of binding events on the sensor surface without the use of fluorescence or radioactive labels.

The SCORE technology was commercialised by Biametrics GmbH, a service provider and instrument manufacturer with headquarters in Tübingen, Germany. In January 2020, Biametrics GmbH and its technology was acquired by BioCopy Holding AG, headquartered in Aadorf, Switzerland.

== See also ==
- Reflectometric interference spectroscopy (RIfS)
- Bio-layer Interferometry (BLI)
- Surface Plasmon Resonance (SPR)

== Literature ==
- Ewald, M., Fechner, P. & Gauglitz, G. Anal Bioanal Chem (2015) 407: 4005. doi:10.1007/s00216-015-8562-0
- Bleher, O., Schindler, A., Yin, MX. et al. Anal Bioanal Chem (2014) 406: 3305. doi:10.1007/s00216-013-7504-y
- Schindler, A., Bleher, O., Thaler, M., et al. (2014). Diagnostic performance study of an antigen microarray for the detection of antiphospholipid antibodies in human serum. Clinical Chemistry and Laboratory Medicine, 53(5), pp. 801–808. Retrieved 2 Mar. 2017, from doi:10.1515/cclm-2014-0569
- Ewald, M., Le Blanc, A.F., Gauglitz, G. et al. Anal Bioanal Chem (2013) 405: 6461. doi:10.1007/s00216-013-7040-9
- Rüdiger Frank; Bernd Möhrle; Dieter Fröhlich and Günter Gauglitz, "A transducer-independent optical sensor system for the detection of biochemical binding reactions", Proc. SPIE 5993, Advanced Environmental, Chemical, and Biological Sensing Technologies III, 59930A (November 8, 2005); doi:10.1117/12.633881; https://dx.doi.org/10.1117/12.633881
- SLAS Technol. 2017 Aug;22(4):437-446. doi: 10.1177/2211068216657512. Low-Volume Label-Free Detection of Molecule-Protein Interactions on Microarrays by Imaging Reflectometric Interferometry. Burger J, Rath C, Woehrle J, Meyer PA, Ben Ammar N, Kilb N, Brandstetter T, Pröll F, Proll G, Urban G, Roth G.
