= John Gogotya =

South African politician (born 1938)

Member of the National Assembly
- In office June 1999 – May 2009
- In office May 1994 – March 1999

Personal details
- Born: Ntsiza John Gogotya; 2 July 1938 (age 87)
- Citizenship: South Africa
- Party: African National Congress (since March 1999)
- Other political affiliations: National Party; Federal Independent Democratic Alliance

Ntsiza John Gogotya (born 2 July 1938) is a South African politician, businessman, and former minister who served in the National Assembly from 1994 to 2009. He represented the National Party (NP) until March 1999, when he defected to the African National Congress (ANC). He is known as the founder of the apartheid-era Federal Independent Democratic Alliance, a black moderate group which opposed majority rule in South Africa and which was later revealed to have been a client of military intelligence.

== Early life and career ==
Gogotya was born on 2 July 1938. He was a businessman and Christian minister in the former Transvaal.

== Apartheid-era political career ==
During apartheid, Gogotya, though black, was an outspoken opponent of proposals for multi-racial democracy on the principle of one man, one vote. He organised on this basis first through Operation Advance and Upgrade, a Johannesburg-based organisation, and from mid-1987 through the Federal Independent Democratic Alliance (FIDA). In the former capacity, he visited Washington D. C. in 1986 to lobby congressmen against passing the Comprehensive Anti-Apartheid Act, arguing that divestment and sanctions harmed black South Africans. He was also an opponent of the Congress-aligned United Democratic Front, which he said necklaced "black moderates like us", and in 1985 he warned American press that the anti-apartheid African National Congress (ANC) had been "swallowed hook, line and sinker by the Communist Party".

By 1990, South African liberals publicly alleged that FIDA was a front organisation for the apartheid government, an allegation denied by Gogotya. In 1996, at the Truth and Reconciliation Commission, Bantu Holomisa claimed that there was evidence that Gogotya had been on the payroll of the South African Defence Force (SADF). The commission ultimately found Holomisa's claim to be correct, concluding that FIDA had been established with funds from SADF's military intelligence division.

== Post-apartheid political career ==
In South Africa's first post-apartheid elections in 1994, Gogotya was elected to the new National Assembly, representing the National Party (NP), the former governing party. He defected to the ANC in late March 1999, ahead of that year's general election. He subsequently served two further terms in the National Assembly on the ANC's ticket, gaining election in 1999 and 2004. In October 1999, Gogotya was the target of an outburst during a parliamentary debate on rape: opposition politician Patricia de Lille, believing that Gogotya was among those heckling her while she read out messages from rape survivors, shouted that Gogotya "will be raped one day".

== Personal life ==
He is married to Wonkie Gogotya.
