= Electro-switchable biosurface =

An electro-switchable biosurface is a biosensor that is based on an electrode (often gold) to which a layer of biomolecules (often DNA molecules) has been tethered. An alternating or fixed electrical potential is applied to the electrode which causes changes in the structure and position (movement) of the charged biomolecules. The biosensor is used in science, e.g. biomedical and biophysical research or drug discovery, to assess interactions between biomolecules and binding kinetics as well as changes in size or conformation of biomolecules.

== Technological background ==
The general principle of a biosurface is a solid surface with an additional layer of biological macromolecules. Because this molecular layer will reversibly respond to changes in the environment of the surface, it is also called “stimuli-responsive monolayer”. The external stimuli can be for example changes in temperature, changes in magnetic fields, mechanical forces or changes in electric fields. Different strategies can be used to attach a monolayer of biomolecules to a surface, for example atomic layer deposition or layer-by-layer deposition. Another option is the fabrication of self-assembled monolayers (SAM). The surface used most often with this strategy is a gold electrode. SAM form by spontaneous organization of the molecules, for example alkanethiolates, on the substrate. SAM can be used as surface layers for nanoparticles, e.g. in MRI contrast agents, they can protect metal films from corrosion, and have many other applications in electrochemistry and nanoscience. For their application as a biosensor, one of the most often used molecules self-assembling on gold electrodes is DNA. Due to its molecular structure, double stranded DNA molecules are negatively charged and rigid. By applying an alternating potential to the biosurface, the attached DNA strands can be moved systematically because they will switch between an upright position and a flat position. This enables the usage of the biosurface as a biosensor.

== Applications ==
The ability to control the electrode potential for electro-switchable biosurfaces facilitates several different applications. One example is the field of molecular electronics, for instance the investigation of DNA-mediated charge transfer.

Another application is the analysis of molecular interactions. To that end, the DNA strand is labeled with a fluorescent dye. Excited fluorescent dyes can transfer energy to metal. Consequently, the fluorescence is quenched in proximity to the metal electrode. To measure interactions, a ligand is additionally attached at the head of the DNA molecule and the interacting analyte is flushed across the biosensor. Two different measurement modes can be performed with the biosensor, a static mode and a dynamic mode. In static mode, the potential applied to the electrode is fixed, keeping the DNA molecule in an upright position. Binding of the analyte to the ligand will change the local environment of the fluorescent dye and thereby quench its fluorescence. The static mode can also be used to measure the activity of enzymes like polymerases that influence the structure of the DNA molecule. In dynamic mode, the potential applied to the electrode is oscillating, thus the DNA molecule switches between the upright and the horizontal position. Binding of an analyte will change the size of the attached complex. Consequently, the hydrodynamic friction will change and the DNA molecule will move through the buffer with a different speed. This speed change can be used to investigate size changes or conformational changes induced by the binding of the analyte. The application of electro-switchable biosurfaces as a sensor for molecular interactions is also known as switchSENSE technology. It belongs to the category of microfluidic surface-bound methods to measure molecular interactions.

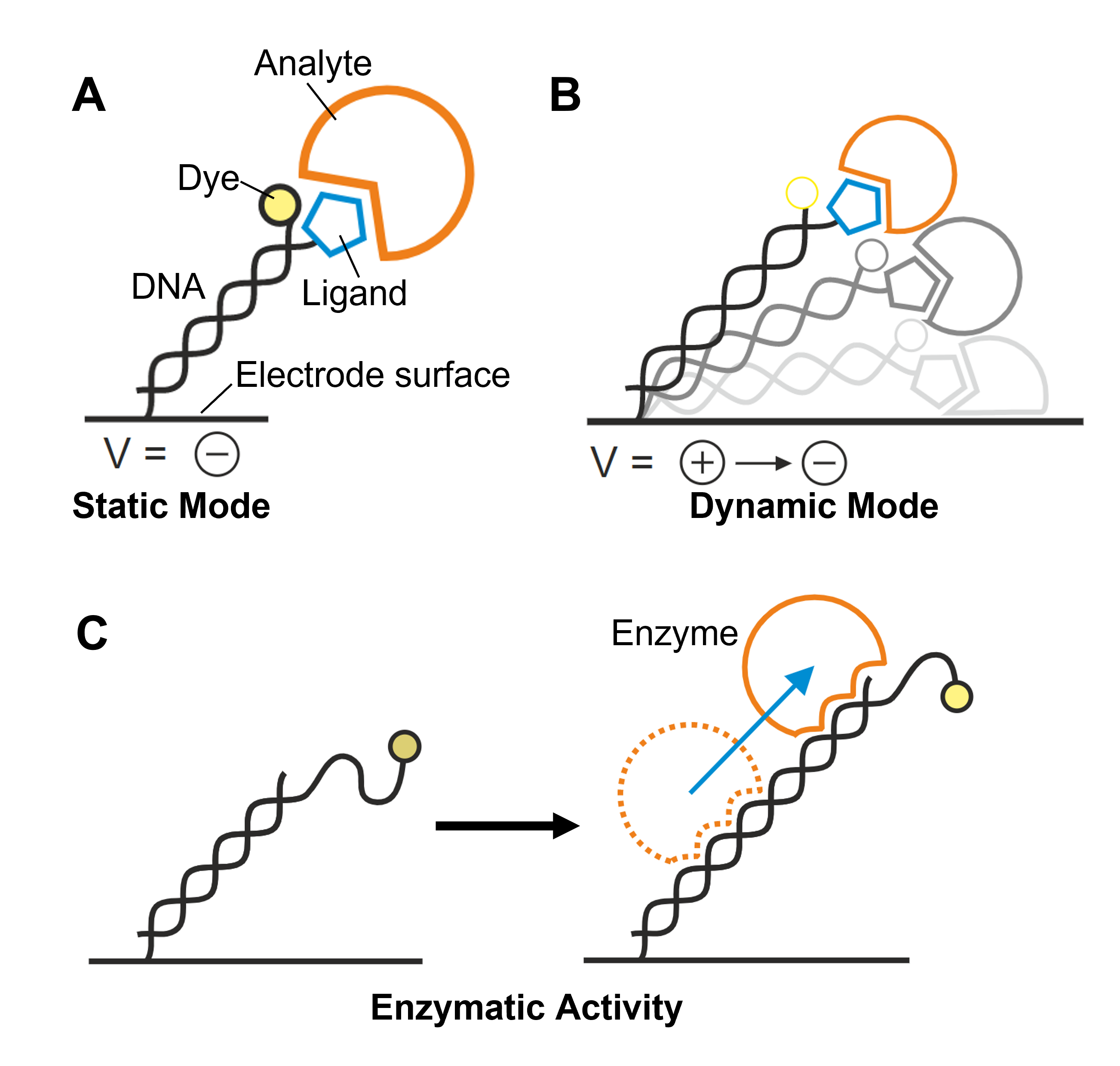
Electro-switchable biosurfaces equipped with DNA strands can be used to analyze the binding of an analyte to a ligand, conformations or enzymatic activity. V = voltage applied to the electrode.

A similar application in this category is surface plasmon resonance (SPR), where a thin gold film on top of a glass slide is the sensor surface. In SPR, the gold film can additionally be modified with SAM or other specific layers. One difference to electro-switchable biosurfaces is that no potential is applied to the SPR surface. In contrast to surface-bound methods, there are also in-solution methods to measure molecule interactions, for example isothermal titration calorimetry (ITC).

The electric potential cannot only be used to control the movement of the DNA strands, but also to control the release of the molecules into solution. This has possible applications in the field of gene therapy since it might enable the delivery of genetic material to specific locations.

== See also ==
- Methods to investigate protein–protein interactions
- Protein-DNA interaction
