= Fedayi =

Fedayi may refer to:

- Armenian fedayi, Armenian civilians who formed self-defense units and armed bands in reaction to the mass murder of Armenians in late 19th and early 20th centuries
- Fedayeen (Arabic for "those who sacrifice themselves"), a term used to refer to various military groups

== See also ==
- FIDA (disambiguation)
- Fida'i, the national anthem of Palestine
- Order of Assassins, a religious sect of Shia Ismailis, also known as Fida’is
- Fidai Khan, Mughal governor of Bengal under emperor Jehangir
- Fidai Khan Koka, Mughal governor in India under emperor Aurangzeb
