= Bruce C. Gibb =

Scottish chemist

- Born: 1965 (age 60–61); Aberdeen, Scotland
- Education: Robert Gordon University
- Known for: Work in aqueous supramolecular chemistry
- Awards: Fellow of the Royal Society of Chemistry (2018)
- Scientific career
- Fields: Chemistry
- Workplaces: Tulane University, University of New Orleans, University of Texas at Austin, Wuhan University of Science and Technology
- Doctoral advisor: Philip J. Cox and Steve M. MacManus

Bruce C. Gibb (born 1965 in Aberdeen, Scotland) is a professor of chemistry at Tulane University. He is notable for his work in aqueous supramolecular chemistry, with particular emphasis on self-assembly leading to compartmentalization, and contributing to fundamental understandings of the hydrophobic effect and Hofmeister effect (e.g. protein solubility in the presence of various salts) Bruce C. Gibb received both his B.Sc. (1987) and Ph.D. degrees (1992) from Robert Gordon University. His Ph.D. Synthesis and Structural Examination of 3a,5-cyclo-5a-Androstane Steroids was carried out under the direction of Philip J. Cox and Steve M. MacManus. He accepted a gratis appointment as a post-doctoral researcher with John Sherman at the University of British Columbia (UBC) in 1993 where he "discovered" his interest in supramolecular chemistry. He worked at UBC through 1994, and subsequently as a post-doctoral researcher with James Canary at New York University from 1994-1996.

Gibb began his independent career in August 1996 at the University of New Orleans. He was then promoted to associate professor with tenure in 2002 and full professor in 2005. He was temporarily displaced to the University of Texas at Austin (UT Austin) following hurricane Katrina into space provide by Eric V. Anslyn and Jonathan Sessler. He was appointed University Research Professor in 2007. In early 2012, he moved to Tulane University and from 2015-2017 was a visiting professor and Chair Professor of Chutian Scholars Program at Wuhan University of Science and Technology.

Gibb is co-editor-in-chief of Supramolecular Chemistry, and has been a regular contributor of thesis articles to Nature Chemistry since 2009. Since 2015, beginning with SAMPL5, Gibb's research group has contributed experimental data to the SAMPL Challenge, pertaining to host molecules octa-acid and tetra-endo-methyl octa-acid.

Gibb has authored or co-authored over 100 publications. Gibb is a member of the international advisory board for the International Symposium on Macrocyclic and Supramolecular Chemistry (ISMSC) since 2015 and was elected a Fellow of the Royal Society of Chemistry in 2018.
