= SAMPL Challenge =

Biochemical research competition

SAMPL (Statistical Assessment of the Modeling of Proteins and Ligands) is a set of community-wide blind challenges aimed to advance computational techniques as standard predictive tools in rational drug design. A broad range of biologically relevant systems with different sizes and levels of complexities including proteins, host–guest complexes, and drug-like small molecules have been selected to test the latest modeling methods and force fields in SAMPL. New experimental data, such as binding affinity and hydration free energy, are withheld from participants until the prediction submission deadline, so that the true predictive power of methods can be revealed. The most recent SAMPL5 challenge contains two prediction categories: the binding affinity of host–guest systems, and the distribution coefficients of drug-like molecules between water and cyclohexane. Since 2008, the SAMPL challenge series has attracte interest from scientists engaged in the field of computer-aided drug design (CADD) The current SAMPL organizers include John Chodera, Michael K. Gilson, David Mobley, and Michael Shirts.

== Project significance ==
The SAMPL challenge seeks to accelerate progress in developing quantitative, accurate drug discovery tools by providing prospective validation and rigorous comparisons for computational methodologies and force fields. Computer-aided drug design methods have been considerably improved over time, along with the rapid growth of high-performance computing capabilities. However, their applicability in the pharmaceutical industry are still highly limited, due to the insufficient accuracy. Lacking large-scale prospective validations, methods tend to suffer from over-fitting the pre-existing experimental data. To overcome this, SAMPL challenges have been organized as blind tests: each time new datasets are carefully designed and collected from academic or industrial research laboratories, and measurements are released shortly after the deadline of prediction submission. Researchers then can compare those high-quality, prospective experimental data with the submitted estimates. A key emphasis is on lessons learned, allowing participants in future challenges to benefit from modeling improvements made based on earlier challenges.

SAMPL has historically focused on the properties of host–guest systems and drug-like small molecules. These simply model systems require considerably less computational resources to simulate than protein systems, and thus converge more quickly. Through careful design, these model systems can be used to focus on one particular or a subset of simulation challenges. The past several SAMPL host–guest, hydration free energy and log D challenges revealed the limitations in generalized force fields, facilitated the development of solvent models, and highlighted the importance of properly handling protonation states and salt effects.

== Participation ==
Registration and participation is free for SAMPL challenges. Beginning with SAMPL7, challenge participation data was posted on the SAMPL website, as well as the GitHub page for the specific challenge. Instructions, input files and results were then provided through GitHub (earlier challenges provided content primarily through D3R for SAMPL4-5, and via other means for earlier SAMPLs). Participants were allowed to submit multiple predictions through the D3R website, either anonymously or with research affiliation. Since the SAMPL2 challenge, all participants have been invited to attend the SAMPL workshops and submit manuscripts to describe their results. After a peer-review process, the resulting papers, along with the overview papers which summarize all submitting data, were published in the special issues of the Journal of Computer-Aided Molecular Design.

== Funding ==
The SAMPL project was recently funded by the NIH (grant GM124270-01A1), for the period of Sept. 2018 through August 2022, to allow the design of future SAMPL challenges to drive advances in the areas they are most needed for modeling efforts. The effort is spearheaded by David L. Mobley (UC Irvine) with co-investigators John D. Chodera (MSKCC), Bruce C. Gibb (Tulane), and Lyle Isaacs (Maryland). Currently challenges and workshops are run in partnership with the NIH-funded Drug Design Data Resource, but this will likely change over time as funding for the two projects is not coupled.

Funding also allowed a broadening the scope of SAMPL; through SAMPL6, its role had been seen as primarily focused on physical properties, with D3R handling protein-ligand challenges. However, the funded effort broadened its focus to include systems which will drive improvements in modeling, including potentially suitable protein-ligand systems. This is still in contrast to D3R, which relies on donated datasets of pharmaceutical interest, whereas SAMPL challenges are specifically designed to focus on specific modeling challenges.

== History ==
=== Earlier SAMPL challenges ===
The first SAMPL exercise, SAMPL0 (2008) focused on the predictions of solvation free energies of 17 small molecules. A research group at Stanford University and scientists at OpenEye Scientific Software carried out the calculations. Despite the informal format, SAMPL0 laid the groundwork for the following SAMPL challenges.

SAMPL1 (2009) and SAMPL2 challenges (2010) were organized by OpenEye and continued to focus on predicting solvation free energies of drug-like small molecules. Attempts were also made to predict binding affinities, binding poses and tautomer ratios. Both challenges attracted significant participations from computational scientists and researchers in academia and industry.

=== SAMPL3 and SAMPL4 ===
The blinded data sets for host–guest binding affinities were introduced for the first time in SAMPL3 (2011-2012), along with solvation free energies for small molecules and the binding affinity data for 500 fragment-like tyrosine inhibitors. Three host molecules were all from the cucurbituril family. The SAMPL3 challenge received 103 submissions from 23 research groups worldwide.

Different from the prior three SAMPL events, the SAMPL4 exercise (2013-2014) was coordinated by academic researchers, with logistical support from OpenEye. Datasets in SAMPL4 consisted of binding affinities for host–guest systems and HIV integrase inhibitors, as well as hydration free energies of small molecules. Host molecules included cucurbit[7]uril (CB7) and octa-acid. The SAMPL4 hydration challenge involved 49 submissions from 19 groups. The participation of the host–guest challenge also grew significantly compared to SAMPL3. The workshop was held at Stanford University in September, 2013.

=== SAMPL5 ===
The protein-ligand challenges were separated from SAMPL in SAMPL5 (2015-2016) and were distributed as the new Grand Challenges of the Drug Design Data Resource (D3R). SAMPL5 allowed participants to make predictions of the binding affinities of three sets of host–guest systems: an acyclic CB7 derivative and two host from the octa-acid family. Participants were also encouraged to submit predictions for binding enthalpies. A wide array of computational methods were tested, including density functional theory (DFT), molecular dynamics, docking, and metadynamics. The distribution coefficient predictions were introduced for the first time, receiving total of 76 submissions from 18 researcher groups or scientists for a set of 53 small molecules. The workshop was held in March, 2016 at University of California, San Diego as part of the D3R workshop. The top-performing methods in the host–guest challenge yielded encouraging yet imperfect correlations with experimental data, accompanied by large, systematic shifts relative to experiment.

=== SAMPL6 ===
The SAMPL6 testing systems include cucurbit[8]uril, octa-acid, tetra-endo-methyl octa-acid, and a series of fragment-like small molecules. The host–guest, conformational sampling and pKa prediction challenges of SAMPL6 are now closed. The SAMPL6 workshop was jointly run with the D3R workshop in February 2018 at the Scripps Institution of Oceanography and a SAMPL special issue of the Journal of Computer Aided Molecular Design reported many of the results. A SAMPL6 Part II challenge focused on a small octanol-water partition coefficient prediction set and was followed by a virtual workshop on May 16, 2019 and a joint D3R/SAMPL workshop in San Diego in August 2019. A special issue or special section of JCAMD is planned to report the results. SAMPL6 inputs and results are available via the SAMPL6 GitHub repository.

=== SAMPL7 ===
SAMPL7 again included host-guest challenges and a physical property challenge. A protein-ligand binding challenge on PHIPA fragments was also included. Host-guest binding focused on several small molecules binding to octa-acid and exo-octa-acid; binding of two compounds to a series of cyclodextrin derivatives; and binding of a series of small molecules to a clip-like guest known as TrimerTrip. A SAMPL7 virtual workshop took place and is available online. A SAMPL7 physical properties challenge is currently ongoing. Plans for a EuroSAMPL in-person workshop in Fall 2020 were derailed by COVID-19 and the workshop is being conducted virtually. SAMPL7 inputs and (as challenge components are completed, results) are available via the SAMPL6 GitHub repository.

=== SAMPL8 ===
SAMPL8 included host-guest components on binding of drugs of abuse to CB8, and a series of small molecules to Gibb Deep Cavity Cavitands (GDCCs), as detailed on the SAMPL8 GitHub repository. An additional pKa and logD challenge focused on pK and logD prediction for a series of drug-like molecules.

=== SAMPL9 ===
SAMPL9 is in planning stages, except that a SAMPL9 host-guest challenge on a host from Lyle Isaacs' group is currently underway. Details are available on the SAMPL9 GitHub repository

=== SAMPL Special Issues ===
- SAMPL3
- SAMPL4 hydration
- SAMPL4 binding
- SAMPL5 distribution coefficients
- SAMPL5 host–guest
- SAMPL6 Part 1 (host-guest)
- SAMPL6 Part 2 (logP) Issue 1
- SAMPL6 Part 2 (logP) Issue 2
- SAMPL7 host-guest
- SAMPL7 logP (Issue 1, Issue 2, additional article)]

=== SAMPL Publications ===
A relatively complete list of SAMPL-related publications is maintained by the SAMPL organizers; more than 150 related papers have been published.

== Future challenges ==
SAMPL is slated to continue its focus on physical property prediction, including logP and logD values, pKa prediction, host–guest binding, and other properties, as well as broadening to include a protein-ligand component. Some data is planned to be collected directly by the SAMPL co-investigators (Chodera, Gibb and Isaacs), but industry partnerships and internships are also proposed.

== See also ==
- Drug discovery
- Lead compound
- Molecular binding
- Molecular recognition
- Molecular dynamics
- Molecular mechanics
- Water model
- CASP
- CAPRI
- BindingDB
