= SPINE (molecular biology) =

SPINE stands for strep–protein interaction experiment. SPINE is a powerful tool to detect protein–protein interactions in vivo. The bait protein has to be expressed with a Strep-tag under the conditions when the potential interaction partners are presumably present in the cells. The addition of formaldehyde links the bait protein to its potential interaction partners. The bait protein together with its potential interaction partners can then be isolated using a Strep-Tactin Sepharose column. The cross-links between the bait protein and the potential interaction partner can be cleaved by heating the samples in Laemmli buffer. Finally, the co-purified interaction partner can be separated by SDS PAGE and identified by mass spectrometry.
