= Fida Hussain Malik =

Major General Fida Hussain Malik

Military service
- Allegiance: Pakistan
- Branch/service: Pakistan Army
- Rank: Major General

Fida Hussain Malik is a Pakistani retired two-star general who commanded 11th Infantry Division in Lahore.

In February 2014, he was promoted to the rank of major general. Major General Fida Hussain Malik was awarded Hilal-e-Imtiaz Military on 23 March 2018.

In 2016, he was named as the director-general Logistics at the GHQ.

Mailk is also an author of a book about Balochistan.
