= Federal Independent Democratic Alliance =

Federal Independent Democratic Alliance (FIDA) was a South African black conservative group set up in 1987. It was later established that it was a front organisation for Apartheid government.

== Background ==
It was established in July 1987 by an East Rand businessman, John Gogotya. It had its origins as a cultural organisation called Operation Advance and Upgrade. Gogotya would later claim his organisation had 600,000 members. Gogotya made statements that the organisation was opposed to Apartheid but willing to talk to the government. Some of the statements made by the organisation included supporting the state of emergency declared by the government in the mid-80's and opposed Western disinvestment imposed on the country. Other policies included supporting the homeland system, a federal system that would replace the provincial system and included the existing homelands at the time and opposed a "one man, one vote" as a political solution.

== Front organisation ==
During the mid-eighties, the SADF Military Intelligence (MI) organisation created Project Capital. The object of the project was to create front organisations consisting of a moderate alliance of Black South African organisations to combat violence occurring in their communities. One of these groups was FIDA. SADF ended the project with FIDA in September 1991, when the MI projects were closed and FIDA received a final payment of R1.47 million. At its height, it had an annual budget of R3 million in 1991, was based in Johannesburg, with offices in thirteen regions in South Africa and employed sixty-eight employees. Supplied information to the MI on the protest movement in the townships through the Joint Management Centres. There, it also distributed anti-protest and anti-boycott pamphlets.
