= CovalX =

Biotechnology research company

CovalX AG
- Type: Private
- Industry: Life Sciences
- Founded: 2005; 21 years ago
- Founder: Ryan Wenzel; Alexis Nazabal; Urs Matter
- Headquarters: Zurich, Switzerland
- Area served: Worldwide
- Products: CRO Business
- Services: MS Analysis
- Website: https://covalx.com/

CovalX AG was originally a Zürich, Switzerland-based company that developed High Mass MALDI detection systems, a mass spectrometric platform for characterizing therapeutic proteins.

== Origins ==
A spin-off of the Swiss Federal Institute of Technology (ETHZ), CovalX was founded by Ryan Wenzel, Alexis Nazabal, and Urs Matter in 2005 as CovalX GmbH and was converted in January 2007 to AG status to allow additional investors into the company.

In 2011, CovalX founded a wholly owned US subsidiary called CovalX Instruments Incorporated located in the Boston area. They began manufacturing and testing the mass spectrometry instruments based on their proprietary technique as well as sales and support for their hardware products.

CovalX developed and patented a technology platform based on mass spectrometry allowing ultra-fast and direct analysis of protein-protein interactions (PPIs) in solution, called High Mass MALDI. The technology has been named on many patents including:

1. Abbvie: Aspects of the application provide anti-hemojuvelin antibodies and methods of using the same in treating myelofibrosis and/or conditions associated with myelofibrosis.
2. Aix Marseille Universite: The present invention relates to antibodies having specificity for BTN2A and uses thereof, in particular for the treatment of cancer.

Since 2009, CovalX began focusing on analytical service measurements through its CRO laboratories and physical locations in Switzerland, France and the US. The company specializes in characterization services for biotherapeutics using its mass spectrometry solutions. Combining its technology platform with other methods such as Hydrogen–deuterium exchange by mass-spectrometry (HDX-MS) and Cross-linking by mass-spectrometry (XL-MS), the company provides services for biotherapeutic development projects.

Applications:

- Epitope Mapping
- DeNovo Sequencing
- HDX-MS
- Protein Interaction

Notable Citations:

CovalX and its proprietary platform has been cited in many leading publications:

- Dang, Xibei; Guelen, Lars; Lutje Hulsik, David; Ermakov, Grigori; Hsieh, Edward J.; Kreijtz, Joost; Stammen-Vogelzangs, Judith; Lodewijks, Imke; Bertens, Astrid; Bramer, Arne; Guadagnoli, Marco; Nazabal, Alexis; van Elsas, Andrea; Fischmann, Thierry; Juan, Veronica; Beebe, Amy; Beaumont, Maribel; van Eenennaam, Hans (2023). "Epitope mapping of monoclonal antibodies: a comprehensive comparison of different technologies". mAbs. 15: 1. doi:10.1080/19420862.2023.2285285. PMC 10730160.
- Rennert, PD; Dufort, FJ; Su, L; Sanford, T; Birt, A; Wu, L; Lobb, RR; Ambrose, C (2021). "Anti-CD19 CAR T Cells That Secrete a Biparatopic Anti-CLEC12A Bridging Protein Have Potent Activity Against Highly Aggressive Acute Myeloid Leukemia In Vitro and In Vivo". Mol Cancer Ther. 20: 2071–2081. doi:10.1158/1535-7163.MCT-20-1030. PMC 9398100. PMID 34253594.
- Trabbic, Kevin R.; Kleski, Kristopher A.; Barchi, Joseph J. (2021). "Stable Gold-Nanoparticle-Based Vaccine for the Targeted Delivery of Tumor-Associated Glycopeptide Antigens". ACS Bio & Med Chem Au. 1: 31–43. doi:10.1021/acsbiomedchemau.1c00021. PMC 8675876.

https://patents.google.com/patent/US20230183369A1

https://patents.google.com/patent/AU2021270458A1

https://patents.google.com/patent/US20220162305A1/en

https://www.mass-spec-capital.com/organisation/covalx-instruments-inc-north-america-group-saugus-massachusetts-2001-26645.html

== Awards ==
In April 2006, CovalX received the CTI Start-up Label from the Swiss Confederation's Commission for Technology and Innovation.[2]
