= Fida Mohammad Khan (senator) =

Pakistani politician

Senator Fida Mohammad

Member of the Senate of Pakistan
- Incumbent
- Assumed office 12 March 2018

Personal details
- Party: PTI (2018-present)

Fida Mohammad Khan is a Pakistani politician who has been a Member of the Senate of Pakistan since March 2018.

== Political career ==
Khan was elected to the Senate of Pakistan as a candidate of Pakistan Tehreek-e-Insaf on general seat from Khyber Pakhtunkhwa in the 2018 Pakistani Senate election. He took oath as Senator on 12 March 2018.
