= Compute Against Cancer =

Compute Against Cancer is an initiative of Parabon Computation, Inc. powered by the Global Grid Exchange. The program provides cancer researchers access to supercomputing capabilities through Parabon’s Frontier Grid Platform. The Compute Against Cancer initiative provides a means for donors to make their spare processing capabilities available to researchers. Donors running Parabon’s Frontier Compute Engine contribute to a large parallel processing network which cancer researchers employ to solve computationally intensive problems.

== Research Projects ==
Since its inception, Compute Against Cancer has partnered with several organizations to carry out grid-powered research initiatives.

=== National Cancer Institute ===
The National Cancer Institute’s Genomic and Bioinformatics Group are currently researching microarray gene-expression patterns. Findings in this area will further the ability to analyze cancer-related data.

=== West Virginia University ===
Under the supervision of Lead Researcher Dr. Michael Andria, West Virginia University’s Blood and Marrow Transplantation Program and School of Pharmacy are analyzing how various combinations of medications, routes and methods of drug administration affect a chemotherapy patient’s quality of life.

=== University of Maryland ===
A team of researchers from the University of Maryland is working with Parabon Computation, Inc. to simulate protein folding. Protein molecules, some of the most basic components of organisms, fold into complex three-dimensional shapes that determine their chemical properties in cells. By replicating this process, the university team hopes to gain a better understanding of protein composition and behavior.
