= Ki Database =

Public domain database of binding affinities for drugs and other chemical compounds

NIMH PDSP
- Founded: August 2006
- Headquarters: Chapel Hill, North Carolina
- Key people: Director: Bryan Roth MD, PhD
- Website: PDSP home page

The K_{i} Database (or K_{i} DB) is a public domain bioinformatics database of published binding affinities (K_{i}) of drugs and other chemical compounds for a wide range of biological targets. The database primarily stores inhibition constant (K_{i}) values, which measure the potency of a compound in inhibiting the binding of a radioligand to a specific target, such as a receptor, neurotransmitter transporter, ion channel, or enzyme.

The resource is maintained by the University of North Carolina at Chapel Hill and is funded by the NIMH Psychoactive Drug Screening Program and by a gift from the Heffter Research Institute. As of April 2010, the database had data for 7,449 compounds at 738 different receptors and, as of 27 April 2018, 67 696 K_{i} values.

== Purpose and uses ==
The K_{i} Database serves as a data warehouse for both internally generated data and data curated from published scientific literature. It is created and maintained by the National Institute of Mental Health (NIMH) Psychoactive Drug Screening Program (PDSP), which is based at the University of North Carolina at Chapel Hill and directed by pharmacologist Bryan L. Roth. The resource is a key tool in the fields of pharmacology, medicinal chemistry, and neuroscience for identifying the molecular targets of psychoactive compounds, predicting off-target effects, and guiding drug discovery efforts.

As of 2017, the PDSP was testing an average of 4,000 compounds in over 215,000 assays annually, with the data being made publicly available through the database. The program is supported by an NIMH contract and has also received funding from the Heffter Research Institute. The K_{i} database has data useful for both chemical biology and chemogenetics.

== See also ==
- BindingDB
- ChEMBL
- DrugBank
- Guide to PHARMACOLOGY
- Inhibition constant (K_{i})
