= Germinal matrix =

Germinal matrix can refer to tissue in at least two places:

- Germinal matrix (brain)
- Germinal matrix (nail)
