= Matricity =

Matricity is the interaction of a matrix with its environment. This word is used particularly of protein interactions, where a polymerised protein (a matrix) interacts with a membrane or another polymer.

Protein interactions can normally be described by their affinities for each other. The interactions of clustered proteins for multivalent ligands are described by avidities (avidity), while matricity describes a semisolid state interaction of a matrix with its environment. As an example matricity has been used to describe the interaction of polymerised clathrin with adaptor complexes bound to the membrane.
