= Reflectometric interference spectroscopy =

Reflectometric interference spectroscopy (RIfS) is a physical method based on the interference of white light at thin films, which is used to investigate molecular interaction.

== Principle ==
The underlying measuring principle corresponds to that of the Michelson interferometer.

== Realization ==
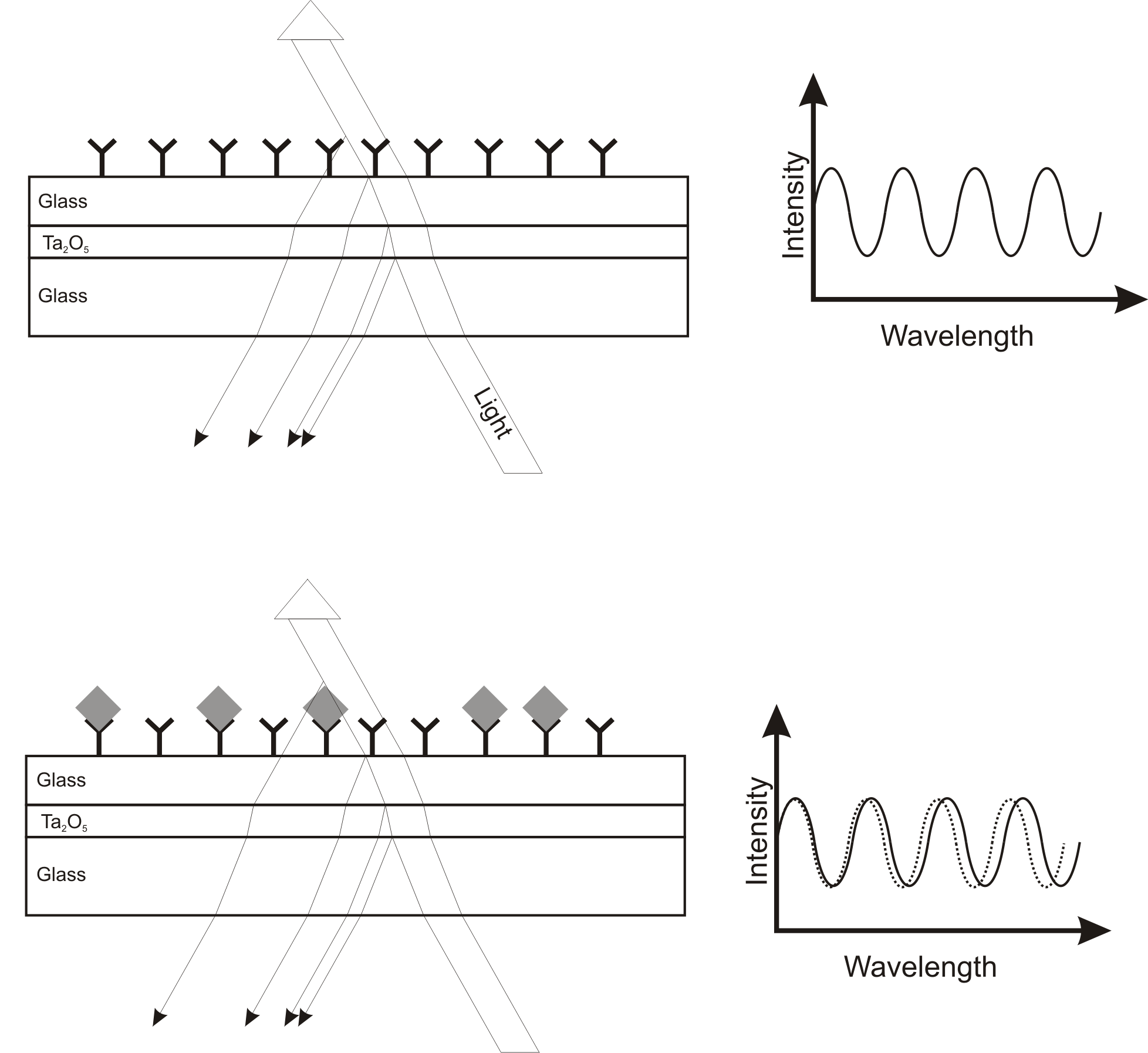
Left: Diagram of the path of rays in the case of multiple reflection at the boundary layers. Right: Diagram of the resulting interference spectrum

White light is directed vertically onto a multiple-layer system of a SiO_{2}, a high-refractive Ta_{2}O_{5} and an additional SiO_{2} layer (this additional layer can be chemically modified). The partial beams of the white light are reflected at each phase boundary and then refracted (transmitted). These reflected partial beams superimpose which results in an interference spectrum that is detected using a diode array spectrometer.
Through chemical modification the upper SiO_{2} layer is changed in a way to allow interaction with target molecules. This interaction causes a change in the thickness of the physical layer d and the refractive index n within this layer. The product of both defines the optical thickness of the layer: n • d.
A change in the optical thickness results in a modulation of the interference spectrum. Monitoring this change over time allows to observe the binding behaviour of the target molecules.

== Application ==
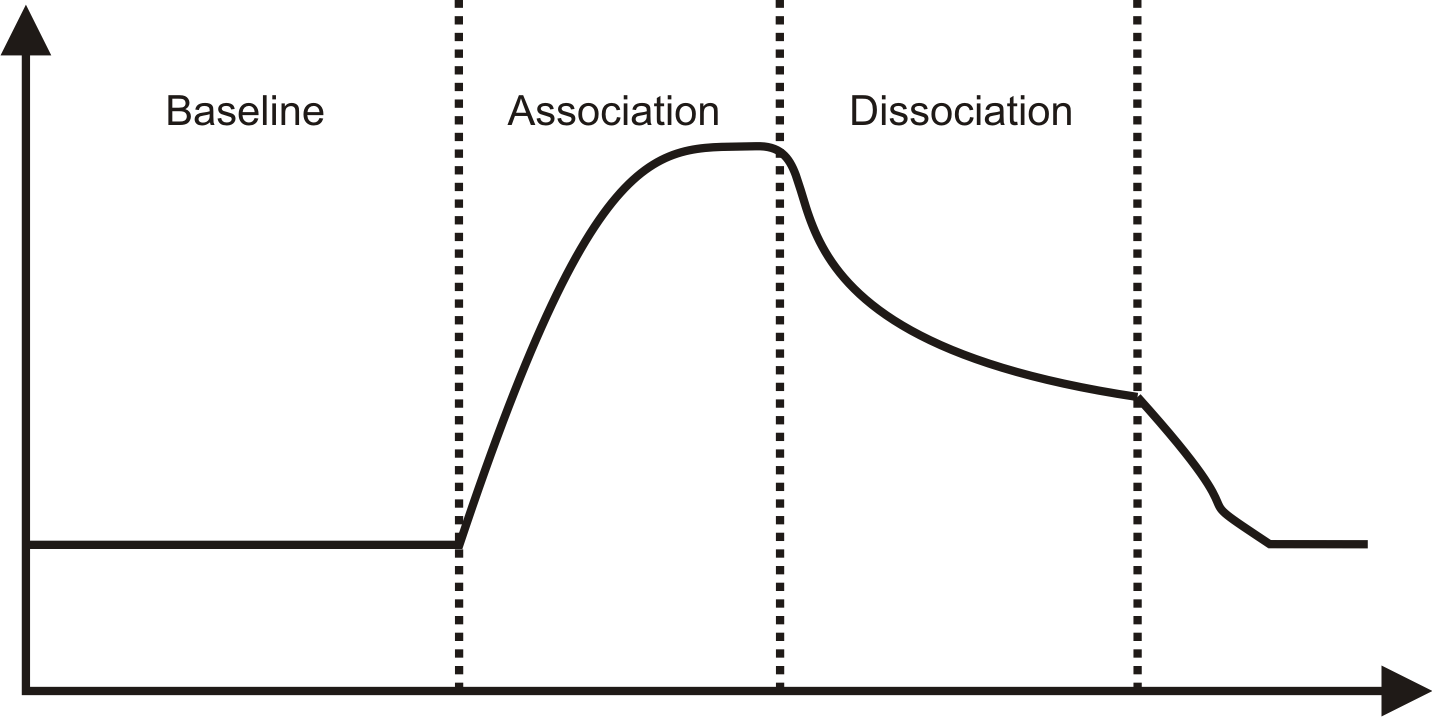
Diagram of a binding curve

RIfS is used especially as a detection method in chemo- and biosensors.

Chemosensors are particularly suitable for measurements under difficult conditions and in the gaseous phase. As sensitive layers, mostly non-selective measuring polymers are used which sort the analytes according to size (the so-called molecular sieve effect when using microporous polymers) or according to polarity (e.g. functionalized polydimethylsiloxanes). When performing non-selective measurements, a sum signal from several analytes is measured which means that multivariate data analyses such as neural networks have to be used for quantification. However, it is also possible to use selectively measuring polymers, so-called molecular imprinted polymers (MIPs) which provide artificial recognition elements.

When using biosensors, polymers such as polyethylene glycols or dextrans are applied onto the layer system, and on these recognition elements for biomolecules are immobilized. Basically, any molecule can be used as recognition element (proteins such as antibodies, DNA/RNA such as aptamers, small organic molecules such as estrone, but also lipids such as phospholipid membranes).

RIfS, like SPR is a label-free technique, which allows the time-resolved observation of interaction among the binding partners without the use of fluorescence or radioactive labels.

== Literature ==
- G. Gauglitz, A. Brecht, G. Kraus and W. Nahm. Sensor. Actuat. B-Chem. 11, 1993
- A. Jung. Anal. Bioanal. Chem. 372 1, 2002
- F. Gesellchen, B. Zimmermann, F. W. Herberg. Methods in Molecular Biology, 2005
- T. Nagel, E. Ehrentreich-Forster, M. Singh, et al. Sensors and Actuators B-Chemical 129 2, 2008
- P. Fechner, F. Pröll, M. Carlquist and G. Proll. Anal. Bioanal. Chem. Nov 1, 2008
