= Flow-induced dispersion analysis =

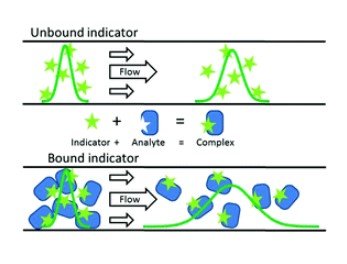
The FIDA principle: A narrow indicator zone is introduced into a capillary under hydrodynamic flow. When the indicator is not bound, a narrow peak is observed at the detector. However, when the indicator is bound by the target analyte, the apparent size increases and a broader peak is observed. This change in size can be used for determine the analyte concentration and interaction - Published by The Royal Society of Chemistry.

Flow-induced dispersion analysis (FIDA) is an immobilization-free technology used for characterization and quantification of biomolecular interaction and protein concentration under native conditions. In the FIDA assay, the size of a ligand (indicator) with affinity to the target analyte is measured. When the indicator interacts with the analyte the apparent size increases and this change in size can be used to determine the analyte concentration and interaction. Additionally, the hydrodynamic radius of the analyte-indicator complex is obtained. A FIDA assay is typically completed in minutes and only requires a modest sample consumption of a few μL.

== Applications ==
- Quantification of analytes (e.g. proteins, peptides, DNA, nanoparticles) in complex solutions (e.g. plasma and fermentation broth)
- Determination of
  - affinity constants
  - binding kinetics
  - molecular size (hydrodynamic radius)
  - oligomeric state
  - diffusion coefficient

== Principle ==
The FIDA principle is based on measuring the change in the apparent size (diffusivity) of a selective indicator interacting with the analyte molecule. The apparent indicator size is measured by Taylor dispersion analysis in a capillary under hydrodynamic flow.
