= Bio-layer interferometry =

Optical biosensing technology

Figure 1 - Bio-layer Interferometry uses the reflection of white light off of two surfaces, the internal reference and the immobilized ligand (with or without bound analyte).

Bio-layer interferometry (BLI) is an optical biosensing technology that analyzes biomolecular interactions in real-time without the need for fluorescent labeling. Alongside surface plasmon resonance (SPR), BLI is one of few widely available label-free biosensing technologies, a detection style that yields more information in less time than traditional processes. The technology relies on the phase shift-wavelength correlation created between interference patterns off two unique surfaces on the tip of a biosensor. BLI has significant applications in quantifying binding strength, measuring protein interactions, and identifying properties of reaction kinetics, such as rate constants and reaction rates.

Figure 2 - Light is reflected both from the reference layer and from the binding layer. If analyte is bound to the immobilized ligand on the sensor tip, the incident and reflected wave have farther to travel, resulting in a phase shift that is observed by the sensor.

== Method ==
=== Mechanism overview ===
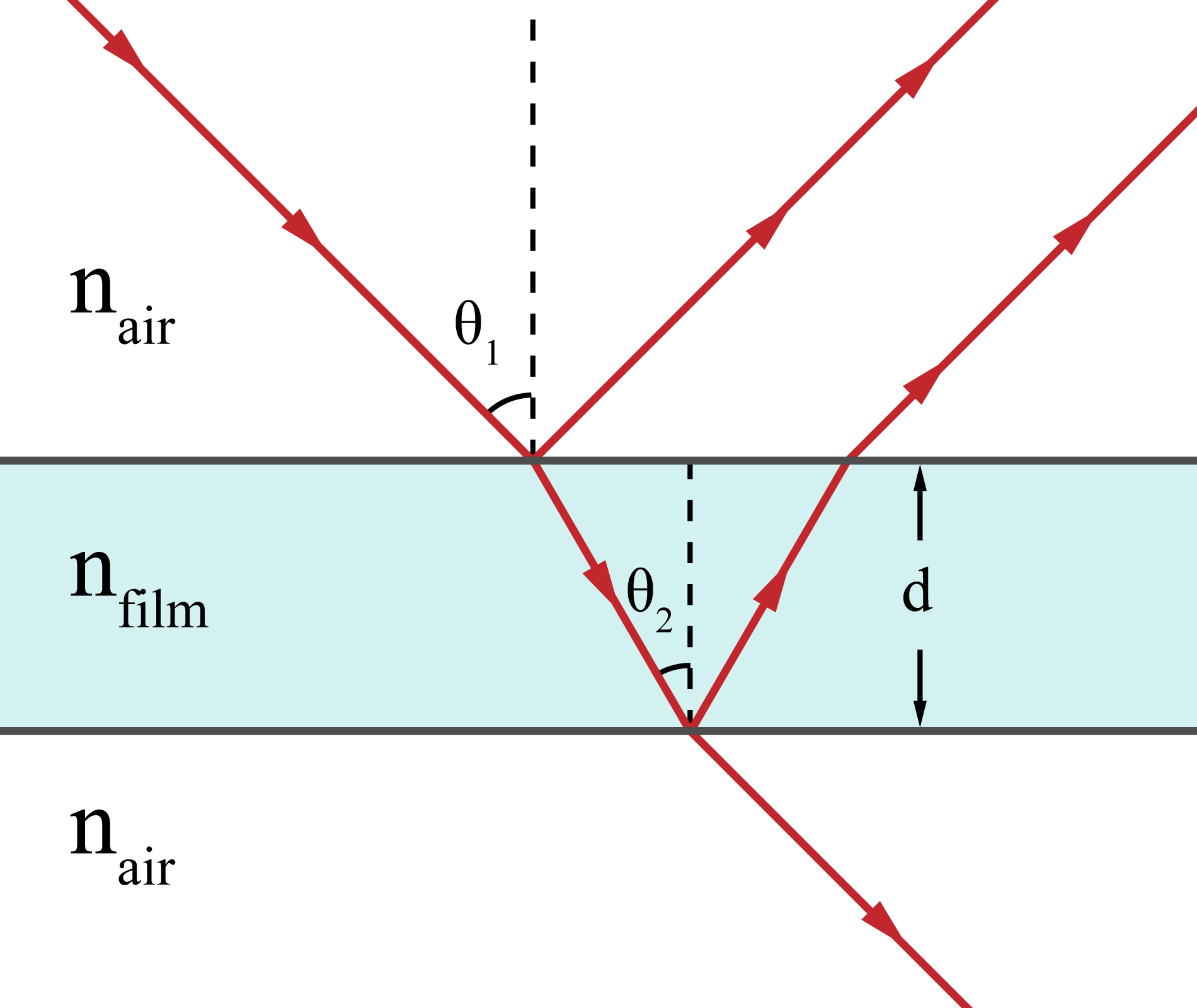
Figure 3 - The ligand-analyte layer creates an optical path length difference, reflecting incident light in two different patterns

Bio-layer interferometry measures kinetics and biomolecular interactions on the basis of wave interference. To prepare for BLI analysis between two unique biomolecules, the ligand is first immobilized onto a bio-compatible biosensor and then lowered into a solution with a biomolecule of interest, or analyte, present. The biosensor tip is then lifted out of solution, and the analyte is allowed to interact with the immobilized ligand. This effectively creates two separate surfaces: one with the ligand unbound to the analyte, and the other with analyte bound to the ligand immobilized on the biosensor tip. The new layer acts as a thin film bound between these two surfaces.

Figure 4 - A phase shift is a result of the addition of the electric fields of the back-propagating light from the biosensor tip.

White light from a tungsten lamp in the biosensor apparatus is then shone onto the biosensor tip and reflected off of both surfaces, (see thin-film interference) creating two unique reflection patterns with differing intensities. When the electric fields combine (see figure 4), the resulting phase difference is observed as a red or a blue shift in the sensor. A longer distance traveled, corresponding to the ligand bound state, results in a red shift in the observed wavelength. A shorter distance traveled, corresponding to the unbound ligand state, results in a blue shift in the observed wavelength. Figure 3 illustrates this phenomenon in a more general form. The wavelength shift (Δλ) between these two reflection patterns creates an interference pattern observed by the sensor. Since the shift in wavelength is a direct measure of the change in thickness between the two layers on the bio-sensor tip, the electric fields will combine in predictable ways in relation to the reference reflection beam. Since these shifts in intensity can be recorded at a very fast rate (limited only by the frame rate of the sensor), the associating and dissociating of analyte with the immobilized ligand can be recorded in real-time.

=== "Dip and read" format ===
Bio-layer interferometry platforms achieve high throughput by utilizing a "Dip and Read" format. The biosensor tips themselves are transported directly to the desired sample and "dipped" into their respective compartment, eliminating the need for micro-fluidics and the complications (clogging, purification) that come with it. This structure is often supported by a robot, and both 96-well and 384-well plate formats are combined to achieve this. This distinct detection method ensures that sample concentration and viscosity and varying refractive indexes rarely affect the results of BLI. Thus, BLI finds significant use in viscous media such as glycerol, where other techniques may struggle.

=== Biosensor type and selection ===
Bio-layer interferometry relies on biosensors with a fiber optic tip upon which the ligand is immobilized. The tip is additionally coated with a matrix biocompatible with the target molecule to limit any non-specific binding. For BLI calculations to work, it is necessary to assume that both the fiber optic tip and the bound ligand and analyte act as thin, reflective surfaces. The biosensors are disposable, resulting in low costs and high commercial availability. Biosensor selection is determined by the desired test results: kinetic analysis, quantitative analysis, or both. Most commercially available biosensor types will be grouped into one of these three categories by the BLI manufacturer.

== Applications ==
=== Analyzing biomolecular interactions ===
A key use of Bio-layer interferometry is to analyze and quantify interactions between sets of biomolecules. BLI is an important method to characterize the interactions of antibodies, nanobodies or other binding proteins with their targets. These binders may be immobilized directly on the biosensor tip without purification from in vitro translation mixes; this immobilization, through SpyTag/SpyCatcher, orients the binder precisely and facilitates rapid analysis of many different binders. BLI is extremely useful in pharmaceutical research, in which biomolecule-membrane interaction may determine characteristics of a given drug. Due to its ability to achieve high-resolution data and high throughput, BLI has been used to identify biophysical properties of lipid bilayers, allowing for an alternative method of study than the traditional in vitro methods currently used (microscopy, electrophoresis). In addition, BLI can be used to study effector complex-target interactions. Where the traditional Electrophoretic Mobility Shift Assay (EMSA) method can be used, BLI can act as a suitable substitute if the provided benefits (label-free, real-time measurements) are desired.

=== Measuring biomolecular kinetics ===
Bio-layer interferometry can be used to analyze binding kinetics in biomolecular systems, i.e. on-rate and off-rate. The benefits that BLI brings provide additional insight into kinetics on top of commonly used endpoint methods like enzyme-linked immunosorbent assay (ELISA). Interference patterns found in BLI experiments can be used to calculate rate constants and other kinetic data in biomolecular interactions. The (relatively) lower sensitivity of the BLI sensor results in less response to changes in sample composition. As a result, BLI can also be used to investigate allosteric effects on enzyme conformational changes.

== Distinguishing characteristics ==
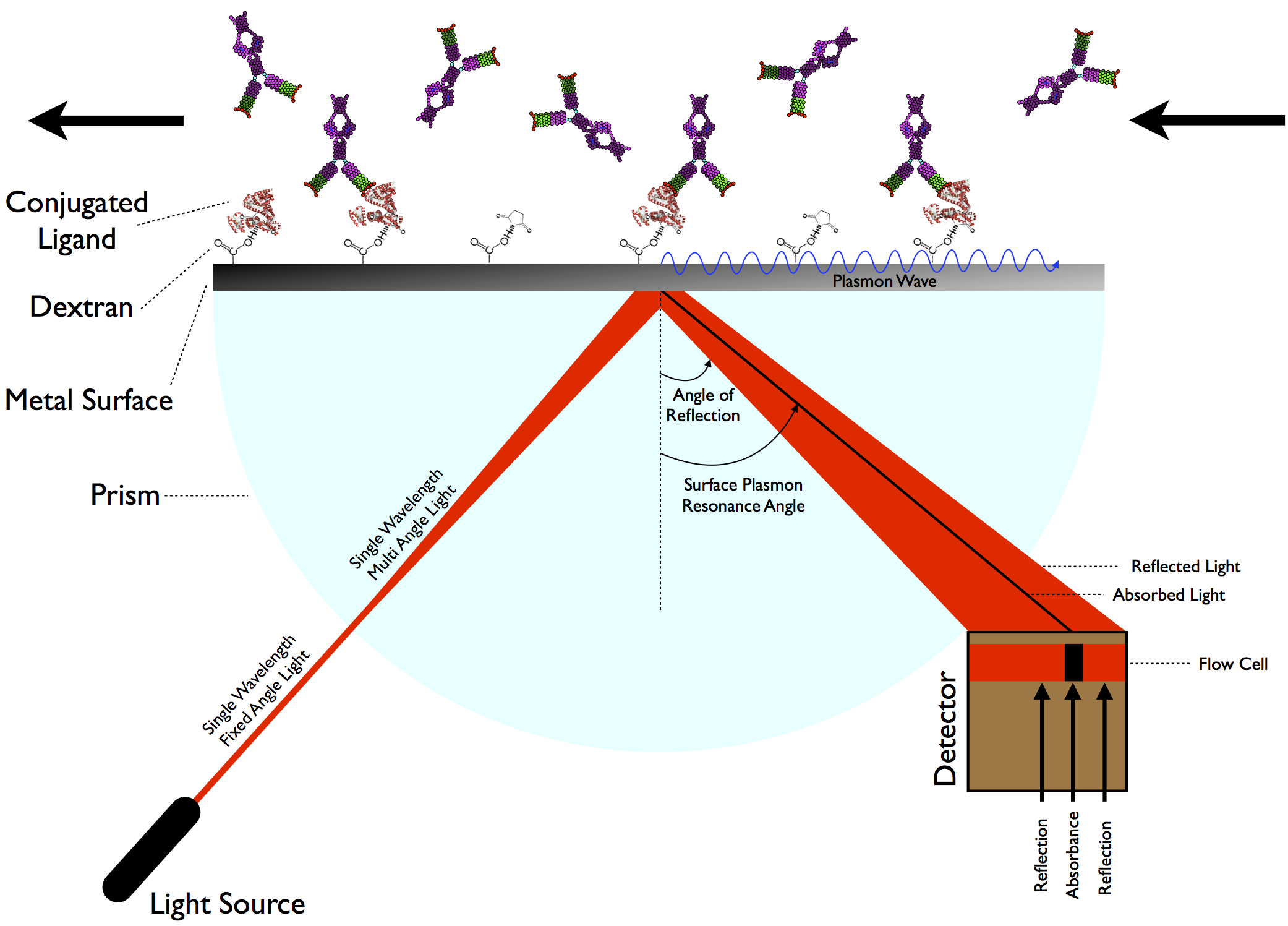
Figure 5 - Overview schematic of Surface Plasmon Resonance

Both BLI and SPR are advantageous over other bio-sensing technologies because they do not require fluorescent labeling and can measure bio-molecular interactions in real time. Despite sharing some similarities in concept, there are significant differences between the two techniques. BLI uses length changes between bound and unbound ligand states to determine binding kinetics and affinity. SPR relies on changes in the refractive index of a metal layer positioned between the immobilized ligand and the biosensor. When analyte is bound to the sensor tip, the refractive index of the metal layer is altered accordingly, reflected in the intensity of the reflected light from the sensor tip. Furthermore, micro-fluidic SPR relies on a closed architecture to transport samples to the stationary sensor chip (Figure 5). In contrast, BLI utilizes an open system, shaking multiple wells on a plate to transport the sensors to the samples without need for micro-fluidics. Being a closed system, SPR's association and dissociation phases are limited by the technology's design. BLI's open plate design results in association and dissociation length limits determined by sample evaporation instead. The technique chosen is a result of the needs of the study. SPR is easily reproducible due to its continuous flow micro-fluidics while BLI's multi-well plate design allows for extremely high throughput in one batch. Assay configuration in BLI can, in stable conditions, allow for recovery of samples, while assay configuration in SPR allows for higher sensitivity. As a result, BLI results are often compared to SPR results for validation.

== See also ==
- Interference reflection microscopy
- Surface plasmon resonance microscopy
