= BindingDB =

Content
- Description: Chemical database
- Data types captured: Molecules with drug-like properties and biological activity

Contact
- Authors: Michael Gilson, Team Leader
- Primary citation: PMID 17145705
- Release date: 1995

Access
- Website: BindingDB
- Download URL: Downloads

Miscellaneous
- License: The BindingDB data is made available on a Creative Commons Attribution-ShareAlike 3.0 Unported License

BindingDB is a public, web-accessible database of measured binding affinities, focusing chiefly on the interactions of proteins considered to be candidate drug-targets with ligands that are small, drug-like molecules. As of March, 2011, BindingDB contains about 650,000 binding data, for 5,700 protein targets and 280,000 small molecules. BindingDB also includes a small collection of host–guest binding data of interest to chemists studying supramolecular systems.

The purpose of BindingDB is to support medicinal chemistry and drug discovery via literature awareness and development of structure-activity relations (SAR and QSAR); validation of computational chemistry and molecular modelling approaches such as docking, scoring and free energy methods; chemical biology and chemical genomics; and basic studies of the physical chemistry of molecular recognition.

The data collection derives from a variety of measurement techniques, including enzyme inhibition and kinetics, isothermal titration calorimetry, NMR, and radioligand and competition assays. BindingDB includes data extracted from the scientific literature by the BindingDB project, selected PubChem confirmatory BioAssays, and ChEMBL entries for which a well-defined protein target ("TARGET_TYPE='PROTEIN'") is provided.

== History and funding ==
The BindingDB project was conceived in the mid-1990s, based upon recognition of the broad value of quantitative affinity data and the inadequacy of journal articles as a means of making these data accessible. A NIST-sponsored workshop in September 1997 validated the concept, and funding from the NSF and NIST enabled initial development of the database with a collection of data for systems of many types, including protein-ligand, protein-protein, and host–guest binding. However, hopes that the database would be populated primarily through depositions by experimentalists were not borne out, and it became clear that the project would have to take responsibility for extracting data from the literature. Given the vastness of the molecular recognition literature and limitations in available resources, this meant that creating a useful database would require limiting attention to a well-defined set of high-value binding data.

The decision was taken to focus on binding data for small molecules with proteins that are drug-targets, or potential drug-targets, and for which the three-dimensional structure is available in the PDB or can potentially be modeled to high accuracy based upon the structure of a similar protein. This choice would aid drug-discovery for the selected targets, as well as the development of both ligand-based and structure-based methods of computational ligand-design. This is the current focus of BindingDB, which is led by Michael Gilson, based at UC San Diego's Skaggs School of Pharmacy and Pharmaceutical Sciences, and supported by a grant from the NIH.

== Capabilities ==
BindingDB's web-interface provides a range of browsing, query and data download tools. These include browsing by the name of a protein Target or by journal citation, query by chemical similarity and substructure, and downloads by target or query result.

== See also ==
SAMPL Challenge
