= James Inglese =

American biochemist

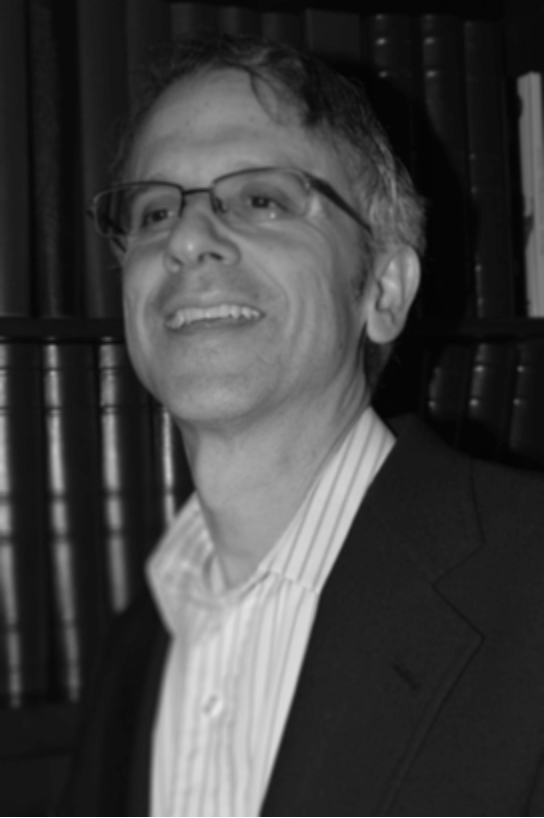
James Inglese

James Inglese is an American biochemist, the director of the Assay Development and Screening Technology Laboratory at the National Center for Advancing Translational Sciences, a Center within the National Institutes of Health. His specialty is small molecule high throughput screening. Inglese's laboratory develops methods and strategies in molecular pharmacology with drug discovery applications. The work of his research group and collaborators focuses on genetic and infectious disease-associated biology.

== Biography ==
Inglese received his BS in Chemistry from the Rensselaer Polytechnic Institute in 1984 and a Ph.D. in Organic Chemistry from the Pennsylvania State University in 1989, where he conducted research under Stephen J. Benkovic on inhibitor design, synthesis and mechanism studies for the reduced folate-requiring enzymes. He pursued postdoctoral studies on G protein-coupled receptors (GPCRs) with Robert J. Lefkowitz at the Duke University School of Medicine. During this time studied the emerging family of G protein-coupled receptor kinases (GRKs), discovering several lipid post-translational modifications regulating GRK function and GPCR interaction.

== Research ==
During the following 10 years, Inglese led research groups in the private sector. At the combinatorial chemistry biotech, Pharmacopeia Inc., he developed methods to enable the company's electrophoretic tag-encoded libraries, pioneering the development of technologies such as micro plate laser scanning cytometry for high throughput screening (HTS). Subsequently, at the Merck Research Laboratories, he directed HTS assay development for the analysis of chemical libraries in the company's drug discovery efforts.

Inglese co-founded the NIH's Chemical Genomics Center (NCGC) in 2004. This came at a time when the academic community was divided with regard to the role of academics in drug development, with many thinking that this should be solely the domain of the pharmaceutical industry. He helped bring new technology and methods to drug development within the NIH. As Deputy Director of the NCGC, he led the development of the Quantitative High Throughput Screening (qHTS) platform in 2006. This pioneered a new approach to HTS that normally relies on a single concentration of a test compound and has been cited over 500 times according to Scopus and Web of Science. Inglese has overseen the use of qHTS in numerous collaborative chemical probe discovery projects a. According to Scopus, as of August 2020, Inglese has published 180 documents that have been cited over 12,400 times. Sixteen publications have been cited more than 200 times, while 35 have been cited 100 times or more.

In 2009, his group's mechanistic studies of PTC124 (Ataluren), then in clinical trials for subclasses of cystic fibrosis and muscular dystrophy, revealed that the precursor discovery and subsequent development may have been guided by a confounding artifact of the reporter gene assay used in its identification and medicinal chemistry optimization. This led Inglese to design a new class of HTS reporter using the concept from physics of a coincidence circuit: by joining two biochemically distinct reporters, separated by a P2A ribosome skipping site, one can distinguish between compounds that act at the level of reporter expression, which will affect both reporters, from compounds that directly affect the activity of one or the other reporter.

Complementing the laboratory's bioassay program, Inglese explores screening strategies to assess pharmacological activity, for example, from secondary metabolites contained in natural product extracts or novel chemical scaffolds derived from synthetic chemistry methodology research. His team's recent efforts have explored topologically expansive mRNA-encoded peptide libraries using a modified mRNA display to identify inhibitors of infectious disease molecular targets . This has led to the discovery of isozyme-selective phosphoglycerate mutase ligands, AKA Ipglycermides.Other recent work involved the development of the Structural Dynamics Response Assay to assess ligand binding to a target protein.

== Professional activities ==
Inglese founded the journal ASSAY and Drug Development Technologies, serving as Editor-in-Chief from 2002 to 2014, and was Editor-in-Chief of the Methods in Enzymology volume 414 on Measuring Biological Responses with Automated Microscopy.
