= Ligand binding assay =

Biochemical analysis procedure

A ligand binding assay (LBA) is an assay, or an analytic procedure, which relies on the binding of ligand molecules to receptors, antibodies or other macromolecules. A detection method is used to determine the presence and amount of the ligand-receptor complexes formed, and this is usually determined electrochemically or through a fluorescence detection method. This type of analytic test can be used to test for the presence of target molecules in a sample that are known to bind to the receptor.

There are numerous types of ligand binding assays, both radioactive and non-radioactive. Some newer types are called "mix-and-measure" assays because they require fewer steps to complete, for example foregoing the removal of unbound reagents.

Ligand binding assays are used primarily in pharmacology for various demands. Specifically, despite the human body's endogenous receptors, hormones, and other neurotransmitters, pharmacologists utilize assays in order to create drugs that are selective, or mimic, the endogenously found cellular components. On the other hand, such techniques are also available to create receptor antagonists in order to prevent further cascades. Such advances provide researchers with the ability not only to quantify hormones and hormone receptors, but also to contribute important pharmacological information in drug development and treatment plans.

== History ==
Historically, ligand binding assay techniques were used extensively to quantify hormone or hormone receptor concentrations in plasma or in tissue. The ligand-binding assay methodology quantified the concentration of the hormone in the test material by comparing the effects of the test sample to the results of varying amounts of known protein (ligand).

The foundations for which ligand binding assay have been built are a result of Karl Landsteiner, in 1945, and his work on immunization of animals through the production of antibodies for certain proteins. Landsteiner's work demonstrated that immunoassay technology allowed researchers to analyze at the molecular level. The first successful ligand binding assay was reported in 1960 by Rosalyn Sussman Yalow and Solomon Berson. They investigated the binding interaction for insulin and an insulin-specific antibody, in addition to developing the first radioimmunoassay (RIA) for insulin. These discoveries provided precious information regarding both the sensitivity and specificity of protein hormones found within blood-based fluids. Yalow and Berson received the Nobel Prize in Medicine as a result of their advancements. Through the development of RIA technology, researchers have been able to move beyond the use of radioactivity, and instead, use liquid- and solid-phase, competitive, and immunoradiometric assays. As a direct result of these monumental findings, researchers have continued the advancement of ligand binding assays in many facets in the fields of biology, chemistry, and the like. For instance, the Lois lab at Caltech is using engineered artificial ligands and receptors on neurons to trace information flow in the brain. They are specifically using ligand-induced intramembrane proteolysis to unravel the wiring of the brain in Drosophila and other models. When the artificial ligand on one neuron binds to the receptor on another, GFP expression is activated in the acceptor neuron demonstrating the usefulness of ligand binding assays in neuroscience and biology.

== Applications ==
Ligand binding assays provide a measure of the interactions that occur between two molecules, such as protein-bindings, as well as the degree of affinity (weak, strong, or no connection) for which the reactants bind together. Essential aspects of binding assays include, but are not limited to, the concentration level of reactants or products (see radioactive section), maintaining the equilibrium constant of reactants throughout the assay, and the reliability and validity of linked reactions. Although binding assays are simple, they fail to provide information on whether or not the compound being tested affects the target's function.

== Radioligand assays ==
Radioligands are used to measure the ligand binding to receptors and should ideally have high affinity, low non-specific binding, high specific activity to detect low receptor densities, and receptor specificity.

Levels of radioactivity for a radioligand (per mole) are referred to as the specific activity (SA), which is measured in Ci/mmol. The actual concentration of a radioligand is determined by the specific stock mix for which the radioligand originated (from the manufactures.) The following equation determines the actual concentration:

$pm = \frac{CPM/SA(CPM/fmol)}{Volume(ml)}\times {0.001(pmol/fmol)\over 0.001(liter/ml)}={(CPM/SA)\over (Vol)}$

=== Saturation binding ===
Saturation analysis is used in various types of tissues, such as fractions of partially purified plasma from tissue homogenates, cells transfected with cloned receptors, and cells that are either in culture or isolated prior to analysis. Saturation binding analysis can determine receptor affinity and density. It requires that the concentration chosen must be determined empirically for a new ligand.

There are two common strategies that are adopted for this type of experiment: Increasing the amount of radioligand added while maintaining both the constant specific activity and constant concentration of radioligand, or decreasing the specific activity of the radioligand due to the addition of an unlabeled ligand.

=== Scatchard plot ===
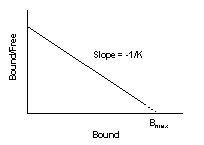
An example of a Scatchard plot

A Scatchard plot (Rosenthal plot) can be used to show radioligand affinity. In this type of plot, the ratio of Bound/Free radioligand is plotted against the Bound radioligand. The slope of the line is equal to the negative reciprocal of the affinity constant (K). The intercept of the line with the X axis is an estimate of Bmax. The Scatchard plot can be standardized against an appropriate reference so that there can be a direct comparison of receptor density in different studies and tissues. This sample plot indicates that the radioligand binds with a single affinity. If the ligand were to have bound to multiple sites that have differing radioligand affinities, then the Scatchard plot would have shown a concave line instead.

=== Nonlinear curve fitting ===
Nonlinear curve-fitting programs, such as Equilibrium Binding Data Analysis (EBDA) and LIGAND, are used to calculate estimates of binding parameters from saturation and competition-binding experiments. EBDA performs the initial analysis, which converts measured radioactivity into molar concentrations and creates Hill slopes and Scatchard transformations from the data. The analysis made by EBDA can then be used by LIGAND to estimate a specified model for the binding.

=== Competition binding ===
Competition binding is used to determine the presence of selectivity for a particular ligand for receptor sub-types, which allows the determination of the density and proportion of each sub-type in the tissue. Competition curves are obtained by plotting specific binding, which is the percentage of the total binding, against the log concentration of the competing ligand. A steep competition curve is usually indicative of binding to a single population of receptors, whereas a shallow curve, or a curve with clear inflection points, is indicative of multiple populations of binding sites.

== Non-radioactive binding assays ==
Despite the different techniques used for non-radioactive assays, they require that ligands exhibit similar binding characteristics to its radioactive equivalent. Thus, results in both non-radioactive and radioactive assays will remain consistent. One of the largest differences between radioactive and non-radioactive ligand assays are in regards of dangers to human health. Radioactive assays are harmful in that they produce radioactive waste; whereas, non-radioactive ligand assays utilize a different method to avoid producing toxic waste. These methods include, but are not limited to, fluorescence polarization (FP), fluorescence resonance energy transfer (FRET), and surface plasmon resonance (SPR). In order to measure process of ligand-receptor binding, most non-radioactive methods require that labeling avoids interfering with molecular interactions.

=== Fluorescence polarization ===
Fluorescence polarization (FP) is synonymous with fluorescence anisotropy. This method measures the change in the rotational speed of a fluorescent-labeled ligand once it is bound to the receptor. Polarized light is used in order to excite the ligand, and the amount of light emitted is measured. Depolarization of the emitted light depends on ligand being bound (e.g., to receptor). If ligand is unbound, it will have a large depolarization (ligand is free to spin rapidly, rotating the light). If the ligand is bound, the combined larger size results in slower rotation and therefore, reduced depolarization. An advantage of this method is that it requires only one labeling step. However, this method is less precise at low nanomolar concentrations.

=== Kinetic exclusion assay ===
Kinetic exclusion assay (KinExA) measures free (unbound) ligand or free receptor present in a mixture of ligand, receptor, and ligand-receptor complex. The measurements allow quantitation of the active ligand concentration and the binding constants (equilibrium, on and off rates) of the interaction.

=== Fluorescence resonance energy transfer ===
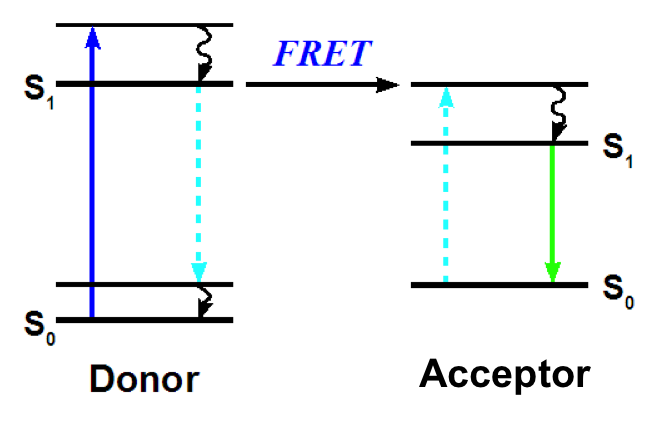
Jablonski diagram of FRET

Fluorescence Resonance Energy Transfer (FRET) utilizes energy transferred between the donor and the acceptor molecules that are in close proximity. FRET uses a fluorescently labeled ligand, as with FP. Energy transfer within FRET begins by exciting the donor. The dipole–dipole interaction between the donor and the acceptor molecule transfers the energy from the donor to the acceptor molecule. If the ligand is bound to the receptor-antibody complex, then the acceptor will emit light. When using FRET, it is critical that there is a distance smaller than 10 nm between the acceptor and donor, in addition to an overlapping absorption spectrum between acceptor and donor, and that the antibody does not interfere or block the ligand binding site.

=== Surface plasmon resonance ===
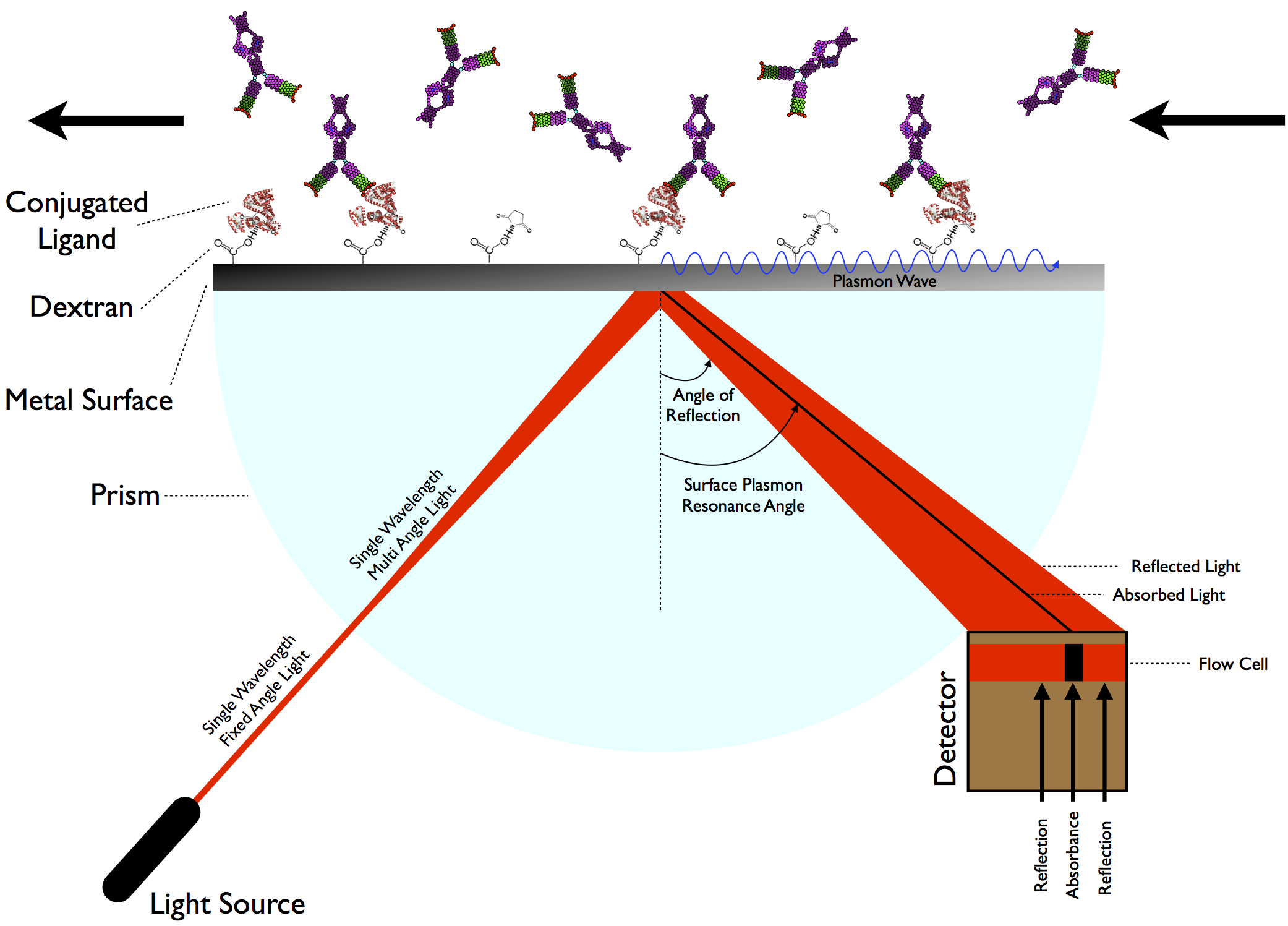
Surface Plasmon Resonance (SPR) configuration

Surface Plasmon Resonance (SPR) does not require labeling of the ligand. Instead, it works by measuring the change in the angle at which the polarized light is reflected from a surface (refractive index). The angle is related to the change in mass or layer of thickness, such as immobilization of a ligand changing the resonance angle, which increases the reflected light. The device for which SPR is derived includes a sensor chip, a flow cell, a light source, a prism, and a fixed angle position detector.

== Liquid-phase binding assays ==
=== Immunoprecipitation ===
The liquid-phase ligand binding assay of immunoprecipitation (IP) is a method that is used to purify or enrich a specific protein, or a group of proteins, using an antibody from a complex mixture. The extract of disrupted tissue or cells is mixed with an antibody against the antigen of interest, which produces the antigen-antibody complex. When antigen concentration is low, the antigen-antibody complex precipitation can take hours or even days and becomes hard to isolate the small amount of precipitate formed.

The enzyme-linked immunosorbent assay (ELISA) or Western blotting are two different ways that the purified antigen (or multiple antigens) can be obtained and analyzed. This method involves purifying an antigen through the aid of an attached antibody on a solid (beaded) support, such as agarose resin. The immobilized protein complex can be accomplished either in a single step or successively.

IP can also be used in conjunction with biosynthetic radioisotope labeling. Using this technique combination, one can determine if a specific antigen is synthesized by a tissue or by a cell.

== Solid-phase binding assays ==
=== Multiwell plate ===
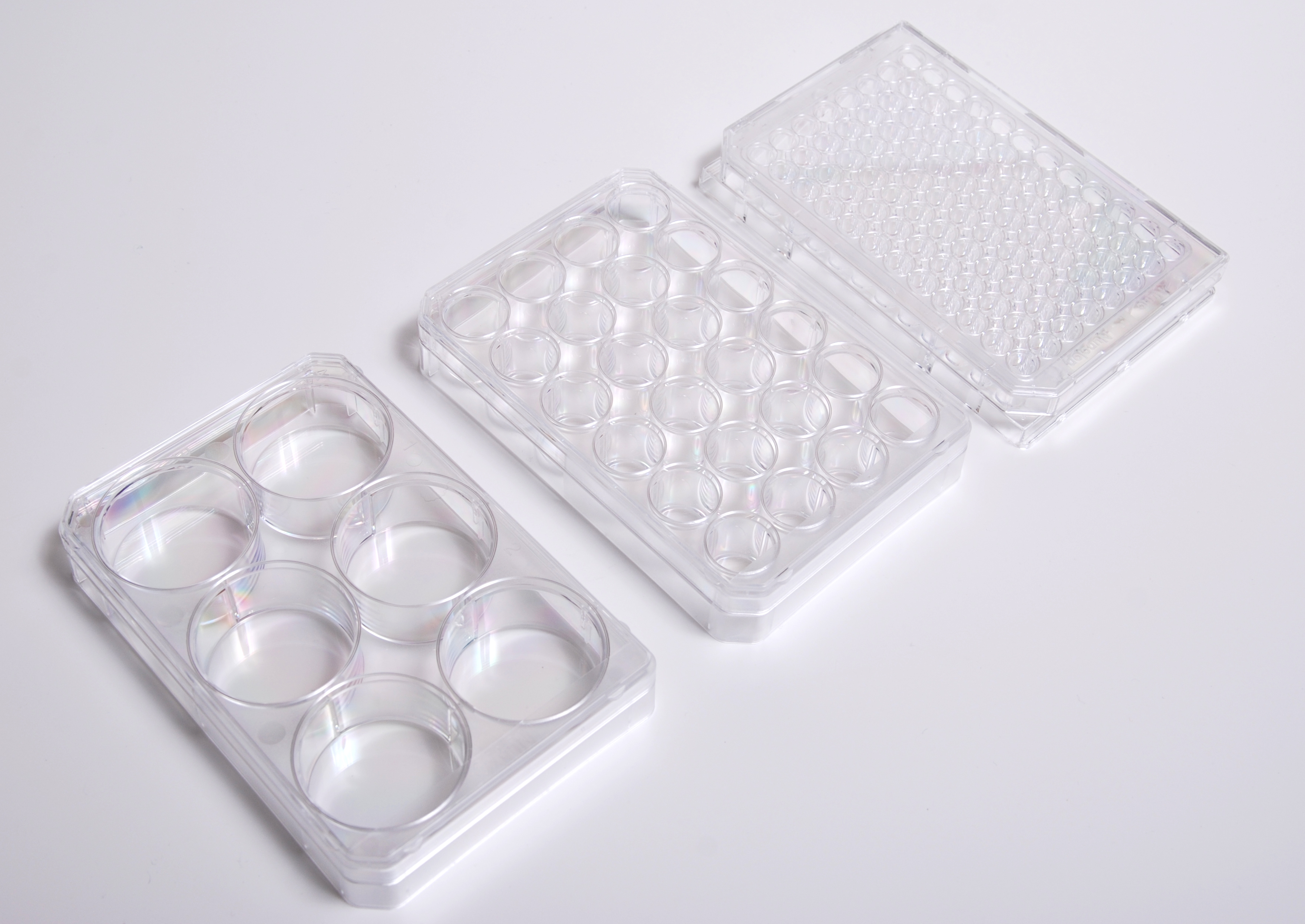
Multiwell plates-set

Multiwell plates are multiple petri dishes incorporated into one container, with the number of individual wells ranging from 6 to over 1536. Multiwell Plate Assays are convenient for handling necessary dosages and replicates. There are a wide range of plate types that have a standardized footprint, supporting equipment, and measurement systems. Electrodes can be integrated into the bottom of the plates to capture information as a result of the binding assays. The binding reagents become immobilized on the electrode surface and then can be analyzed.

The multiwell plates are manufactured to allow researchers to create and manipulate different types of assays (i.e., bioassays, immunoassays, etc.) within each multiwell plate. Due to the variability in multiwell plate formatting, it is not uncommon for artifacts to arise. Artifacts are due to the different environments found within the different wells on the plate, especially near the edges and center of the wells. Such effects are known as well effects, edge effects, and plate effects. Thus, emphasizing the necessity to position assay designs in the correct manner both within, and between, each plate.

The use of multiwell plates are common when measuring in vitro biological assay activity, or measuring immunoreactivity through immunoassays. Artifacts can be avoided by maintaining plate uniformity by applying the same dose of the specific medium in each well, in addition to maintaining atmospheric pressure and temperature rates in order to reduce humidity.

=== On-bead binding ===
On-Bead Ligand Binding assays are isolation methods for basic proteins, DNA/RNA or other biomolecules located in undefined suspensions and can be used in multiple biochromatographic applications. Bioaffine ligands are covalently bound to silica beads with terminal negatively charged silanol groups or polystyrene beads and are used for isolation and purification of basic proteins or adsorption of biomolecules. After binding the separation is performed by centrifugation (density separation) or by magnetic field attraction (for magnetic particles only). The beads can be washed to provide purity of the isolated molecule before dissolving it by ion exchange methods. Direct analyzation methods based on enzymatic/fluorescent detection (e.g. HRP, fluorescent dye) can be used for on-bead determination or quantification of bound biomolecules.

=== Filter ===
Filter assays are a solid-phase ligand binding assay that use filters to measure the affinity between two molecules. In a filter binding assay, the filters are used to trap cell membranes by sucking the medium through them. This rapid method occurs at a fast speed in which filtration and a recovery can be achieved for the found fraction. Washing filters with a buffer removes residual unbound ligands and any other ligands present that are capable of being washed away from the binding sites. The receptor-ligand complexes present while the filter is being washed will not dissociate significantly because they will be completely trapped by the filters. Characteristics of the filter are important for each job being done. A thicker filter is useful to get a more complete recovery of small membrane pieces, but may require a longer wash time. It is recommended to pretreat the filters to help trap negatively charged membrane pieces. Soaking the filter in a solution that would give the filter a positive surface charge would attract the negatively charged membrane fragments.

=== Real-time cell-binding ===
In this type of assay the binding of a ligand to cells is followed over time. The obtained signal is proportional to the number of ligands bound to a target structure, often a receptor, on the cell surface. Information about the ligand-target interaction is obtained from the signal change over time and kinetic parameters such as the association rate constant k_{a}, the dissociation rate constant k_{d} and the affinity K_{D} can be calculated. By measuring the interaction directly on cells, no isolation of the target protein is needed, which can otherwise be challenging, especially for some membrane proteins. To ensure that the interaction with the intended target structure is measured appropriate biological controls, such as cells not expressing the target structure, are recommended.

Real-time measurements using label-free or label-based approaches have been used to analyze biomolecular interactions on fixated or on living cells.

The advantage of measuring ligand-receptor interactions in real-time, is that binding equilibrium does not need to be reached for accurate determination of the affinity.

== Binding specificity ==
The effects of a drug are a result of their binding selectivity with macromolecule properties of an organism, or the affinity with which different ligands bind to a substrate. More specifically, the specificity and selectivity of a ligand to its respective receptor provides researchers the opportunity to isolate and produce specific drug effects through the manipulation of ligand concentrations and receptor densities. Hormones and neurotransmitters are essential endogenous regulatory ligands that affect physiological receptors within an organism. Drugs that act upon these receptors are incredibly selective in order to produce required responses from signaling molecules.

Specific binding refers to the binding of a ligand to a receptor, and it is possible that there is more than one specific binding site for one ligand. Non specific binding refers to the binding of a ligand to something other than its designated receptor such as various other receptors, or different types of transporters in the cell membrane. For example, various antagonists can bind to multiple types receptors. In the case of muscarinic antagonists, they can also bind to histamine receptors. Such binding patterns are technically considered specific, as the destination of the ligand is specific to multiple receptors. However, researchers may not be focused on such behaviors compared to other binding factors. Nevertheless, nonspecific binding behavior is very important information to acquire. These estimates are measured by examining how a ligand binds to a receptor while simultaneously reacting to a substitute agent (antagonist) that will prevent specific binding to occur.

Specific binding types to ligand and receptor interactions:

Mimics Endogenous Effects	Inhibits Endogenous Effects
Agonist	Antagonist
Partial Agonist	Negative Antagonists (see: Inverse agonist)

== Technological advances ==
Technologies for ligand binding assay continue to advance related to the increasing the speed and to keeping cost-effective procedures while maintaining and increasing the accuracy and sensitivity. Some technological advances include new binding reagents as alternatives to antibodies, alternative dye solutions and micro plate systems, and the development of a methods to skip the filtration step, which is required in many ligand binding assay processes.

A prominent signaling molecule in cells is Calcium, (Ca2+), which can be detected with a Fluo-4 acetoxymethyl dye. It binds to free Ca2+ ions, which in turn slightly increase fluorescence of the Fluo-4 AM. The drawback of the Fluo-4 dye formulation is that a washing step is required to remove extracellular dye, which may provide unwanted background signals. For instance, washing puts additional stress on the cells, as well as consumes time, which prevents a timely analysis.[16] Recently, an alternative dye solution and microplate system has been developed called FLIPR® (fluorometric imaging plate reader), which uses a Calcium 3 assay reagent that does not require a washing step. As a result, change in dye fluorescence can be viewed in real time with no delay using an excitatory laser and a charge-coupled device.

Many ligand binding assays require a filtration step to separate bound and unbound ligands before screening. A method called Scintillation proximity assay (SPA) has been recently developed, which eliminates this otherwise crucial step. It works through crystal lattice beads, which are coated with ligand coupling molecules and filled with cerium ions. These give off bursts of light when stimulated by an isotope, which can easily be measured. Ligands are radiolabeled using either 3H or 125I, and released into the assay. Since only the radioligands that directly bind to the beads initiate a signal, free-ligands do not interfere during the screening process.

Conformational structure and vibrational motions can change between a protein's ligand-free and its ligand-bound state. The Structural Dynamics Response Assay (SDR) detects ligand-mediated changes to the natural motion of a target protein. These changes can be coupled to the light output intensity of a luciferase sensor protein fused to the target protein to provide a highly sensitive measure of ligand binding. Further, the SDR assay does not require labeled ligands, separation steps, or thermal gradients, and has been shown to work in assay volumes as low as 6 uL.

== Limitations ==
Whole-body PET scan using ^{18}F-FDG

By nature, assays must be carried out in a controlled environment in vitro, so this method does not provide information about receptor binding in vivo. The results obtained can only verify that a specific ligand fits a receptor, but assays provide no way of knowing the distribution of ligand-binding receptors in an organism.

In vivo ligand binding and receptor distribution can be studied using Positron Emission Tomography (PET), which works by induction of a radionuclide into a ligand, which is then released into the body of a studied organism. The radiolabeled ligands are spatially located by a PET scanner to reveal areas in the organism with high concentrations of receptors.

== See also ==
- Immunoassay
