= Wipe test counter =

A wipe test counter is a device used to measure for possible radioactive contamination in a variety of environments. When using radioactive materials it is necessary to test for accidental contamination, whether from use of liquid unsealed sources or to check for leaking sealed sources. A swab or small absorbent smear can be used to “wipe” an area, the wipe is then placed into a test tube and counted, typically using a gamma counter. Testing for leaks in this manner is a method described in the ISO 9978 standard.

== Equipment ==
Survey instruments may be used to detect surface contamination without requiring wiping, however this requires careful calibration and technique to ensure adequate sensitivity is achieved.

A gamma counter is a typical choice for measuring wipe samples for radioactivity as it allows multiple tests to be counted in a largely automated way. These systems detect radiation using a scintillator and photomultiplier tube and may allow the energy spectrum of a sample to be recorded, which can be used to identify the contaminant.

Use of a gamma camera has also been proposed, where collimators are removed to improve sensitivity.

== Regulation ==
Wipe testing is typically a requirement of licenses to hold radioactive materials. In the United States the Nuclear Regulatory Commission requires wipe testing of sealed sources "periodically" using equipment sensitive down to 185 Becquerels. In the United Kingdom the Health and Safety Executive guidance for the Ionising Radiations Regulations 1999 requires wipe testing (usually every two years) and it is also likely to be a requirement of Environment Agency permits. In Australia licence conditions may require adherence to Australian standard AS2243.4 and ISO 9978 for wipe testing of sealed sources.
