= Gamma counter =

Instrument to measure gamma activity

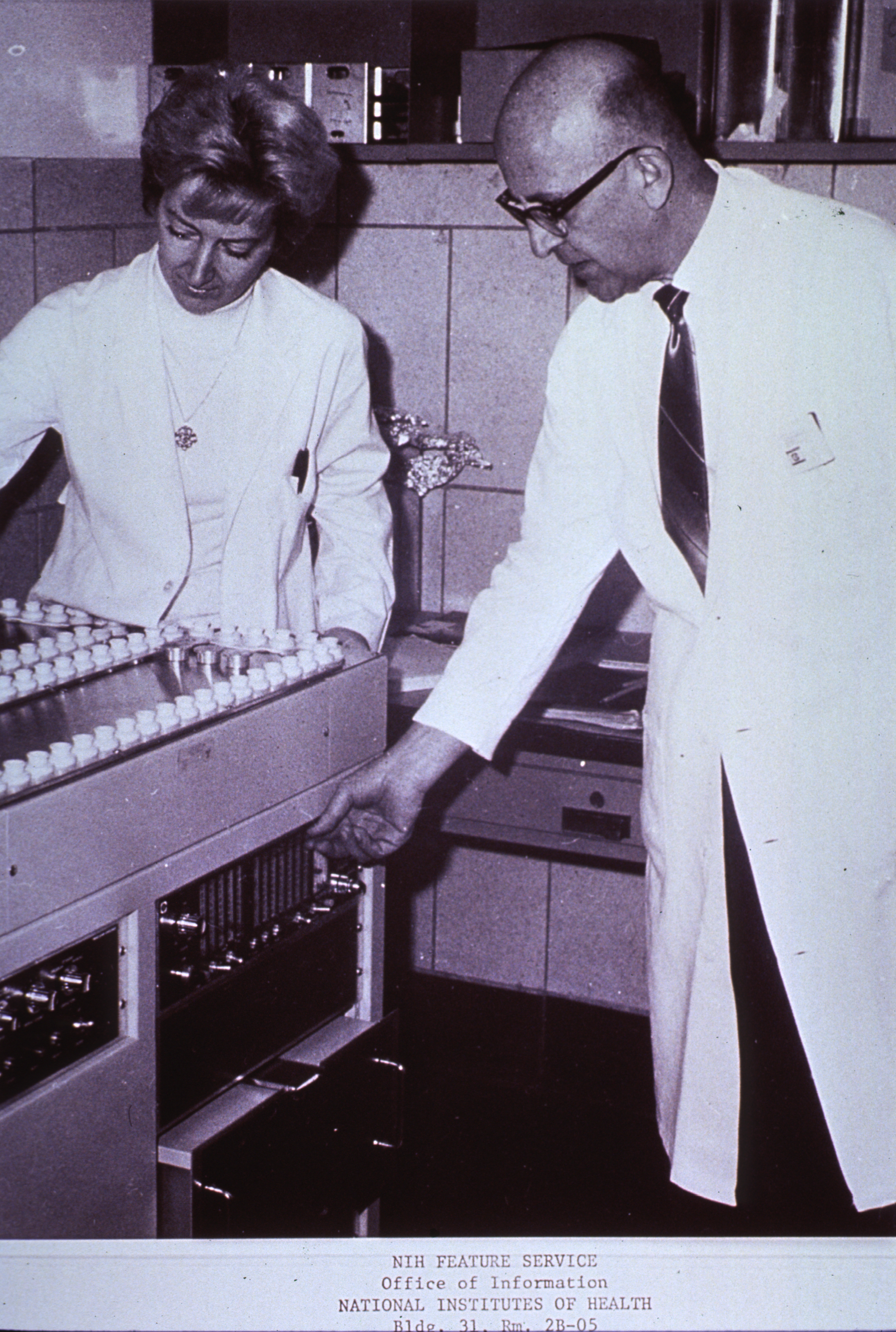
Technologists use a gamma counter to measure hormone concentrations in the blood and pituitaries using such methods as radio-immuno assays and competitive protein-binding assays.

A gamma counter is an instrument to measure gamma radiation emitted by a radionuclide. Unlike survey meters, gamma counters are designed to measure small samples of radioactive material, typically with automated measurement and movement of multiple samples.

== Operation ==
Gamma counters are usually scintillation counters. In a typical system, a number of samples are placed in sealed vials or test tubes, and moved along a track. One at a time, they move down inside a shielded detector, set to measure specific energy windows characteristic of the particular isotope. Within this shielded detector there is a scintillation crystal that surrounds the radioactive sample. Gamma rays emitted from the radioactive sample interact with the crystal, are absorbed, and light is emitted. A detector, such as a photomultiplier tube converts the visible light to an electrical signal. Depending on the half-life and concentration of the sample, measurement times may vary from 0.02 minutes to several hours.

If the photon has too low of an energy level it will be absorbed into the scintillation crystal and never be detected. If the photon has too high of an energy level the photons may just pass right through the crystal without any interaction. Thus the thickness of the crystal is very important when sampling radioactive materials using the Gamma Counter.

== Applications ==
Gamma counters are standard tools used in the research and development of new radioactive compounds used for diagnosing (and treating disease) as in PET scanning. Gamma counters are used in radiobinding assays, radioimmunoassays (RIA) and nuclear medicine measurements such as GFR and hematocrit.

Some gamma counters can be used for gamma spectroscopy to identify radioactive materials based on their output energy spectrum, e.g. as a wipe test counter.
