= Structural Dynamics Response Assay =

Biochemical analysis procedure

The structural dynamics response (SDR) assay is a type of biophysical test used to measure ligand binding to a target protein. The assay is configured as a simple mix and read format that can be conducted in very low volumes, therefore suitable for drug discovery applications such as high throughput screening (HTS), or in the development of a drug candidate during medicinal chemistry optimization cycles.

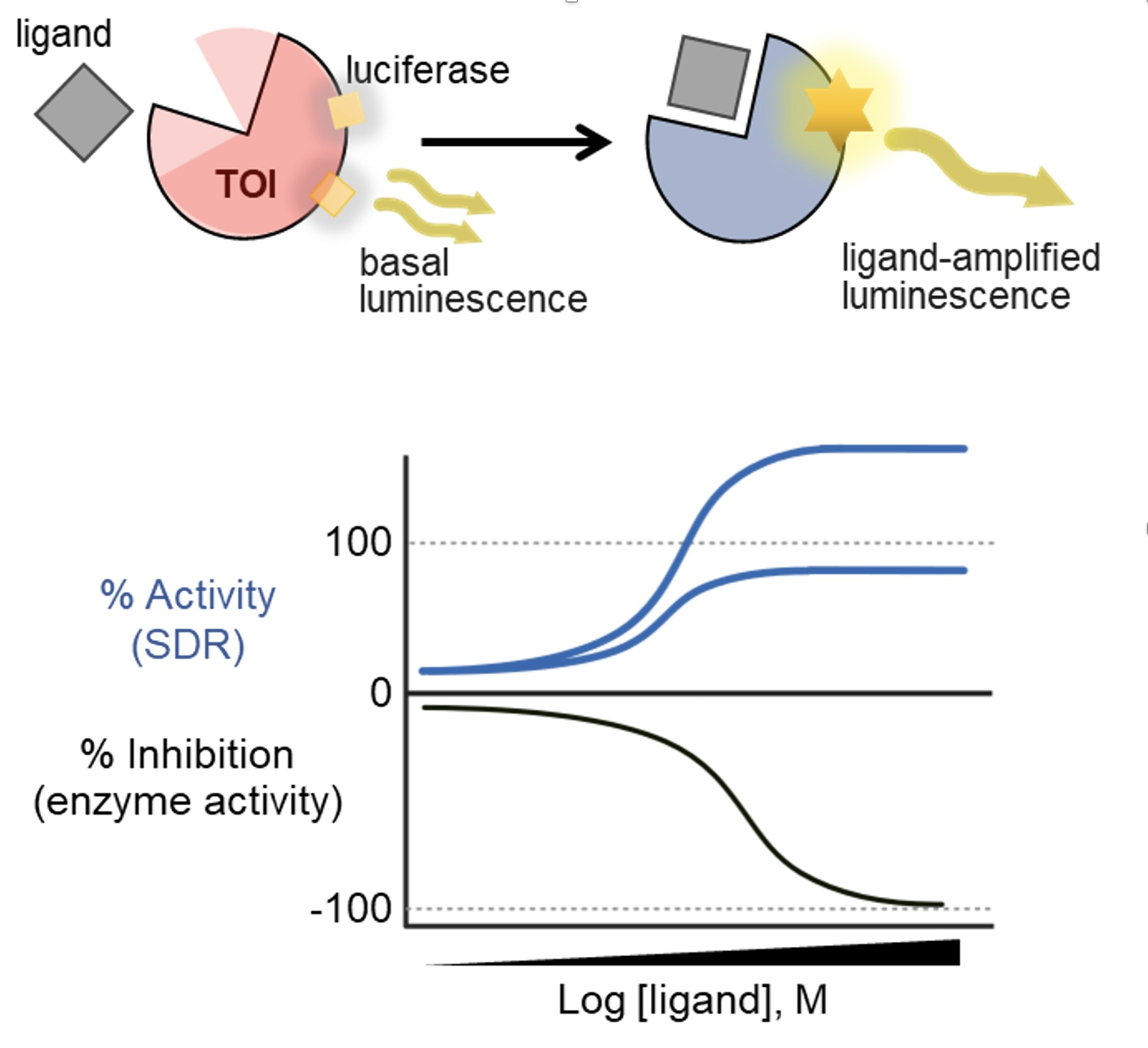
Figure 1. Structural Dynamics Response (SDR) assay concept. (top) SDR is based on the sensing of a ligand binding event at a target protein of interest (TOI) through the change in light intensity of an attached luciferase. In the figure the TOI (red)-luciferase (yellow diamond) fusion represents a protein in various conformations prior to ligand binding. The ligand-bound TOI (blue)-luciferase (yellow star) represents the more conformationally restrained TOI and the resultant amplified luminescence. (bottom) Concentration response plots illustrating a typical ligand binding event as measured either by inhibition of the functional activity of the TOI (black cure) or SDR (blue curves), where ligand binding results in a gain-of-signal output which can vary in amplitude depending on the nature of the TOI and ligand.

== Principle ==
The SDR ligand-binding assay is based on the observation that ligand binding to a target protein of interest (TOI) can affect the output intensity of a cojoined sensor enzyme (Figure 1). The initial studies suggest that the SDR assay can be useful for a broad spectrum of proteins that could include drug targets and those of agrochemical concern.

The SDR assay appears to exploit ligand-biased changes in the structural dynamics or conformation of the target protein (protein dynamics) to modulate the luminescence of a sensor enzyme fused to either the N- or C-terminus of the target protein. The SDR assay does not require a competitive ligand as needed in techniques such as the fluorescence polarization immunoassay (FP) or other related competition binding type assays. Also, the SDR assay is independent of the function of the target protein. This is of particular significance for enzyme targets catalyzing reactions for which the substrates are, for example unobtainable, unstable, or unknown.

The method has been shown to detect the binding of asciminib at the myristic acid binding site of the Abelson tyrosine kinase domain. This is of significance because asciminib does not inhibit the tyrosine kinase catalytic activity in biochemical assays that measure substrate phosphorylation or cofactor ATP turnover, suggesting the SDR assay can be useful in detecting allosteric site binding ligands.

The generality of the method has been demonstrated with various classes of enzymes using either intact Nanoluc luciferase (NLuc) or the alpha-complementation enabling 11 amino acid HiBiT sequence. The extremely high sensitivity of the method has been shown to enable the evaluation of a TOI tested as the cell lysate obtained by CRISPR/Cas9-mediated target gene editing.

== Application ==
The SDR assay has been demonstrated in quantitative high throughput screening (qHTS) in 1536-well microtiter plate format with enzymes from the following enzyme classes: ATP cofactor-dependent monooxygenase using firefly luciferase (FLuc); oxidoreductase using dihydrofolate reductase (DHFR); tyrosine kinase using Abelson tyrosine kinase domain (ABL1); serine/threonine protein kinase using protein kinase A (PKA); isomerase using co-factor independent phosphoglycerate mutase (iPGM); NAD+- and ATP-dependent DNA ligases, using E. coli DNA ligase and bacteriophage T7 DNA ligase, respectively.
