= Radiobinding assay =

A radiobinding assay is a method of detecting and quantifying antibodies targeted toward a specific antigen. As such, it can be seen as the inverse of radioimmunoassay, which quantifies an antigen by use of corresponding antibodies.

== Technique ==
The corresponding antigen is radiolabeled and mixed with the fluid that may contain the antibody, such as blood serum from a person. Presence of antibodies causes precipitation of antibody-antigen complexes that can be collected by centrifugation into pellets. The amount of antibody is proportional to the radioactivity of the pellet, as determined by gamma counting.

== Uses ==
It is used to detect most autoantibodies seen in latent autoimmune diabetes.
