= Ipglycermides =

Group of chemical compounds

Ipglycermide Ce-2 Y7F
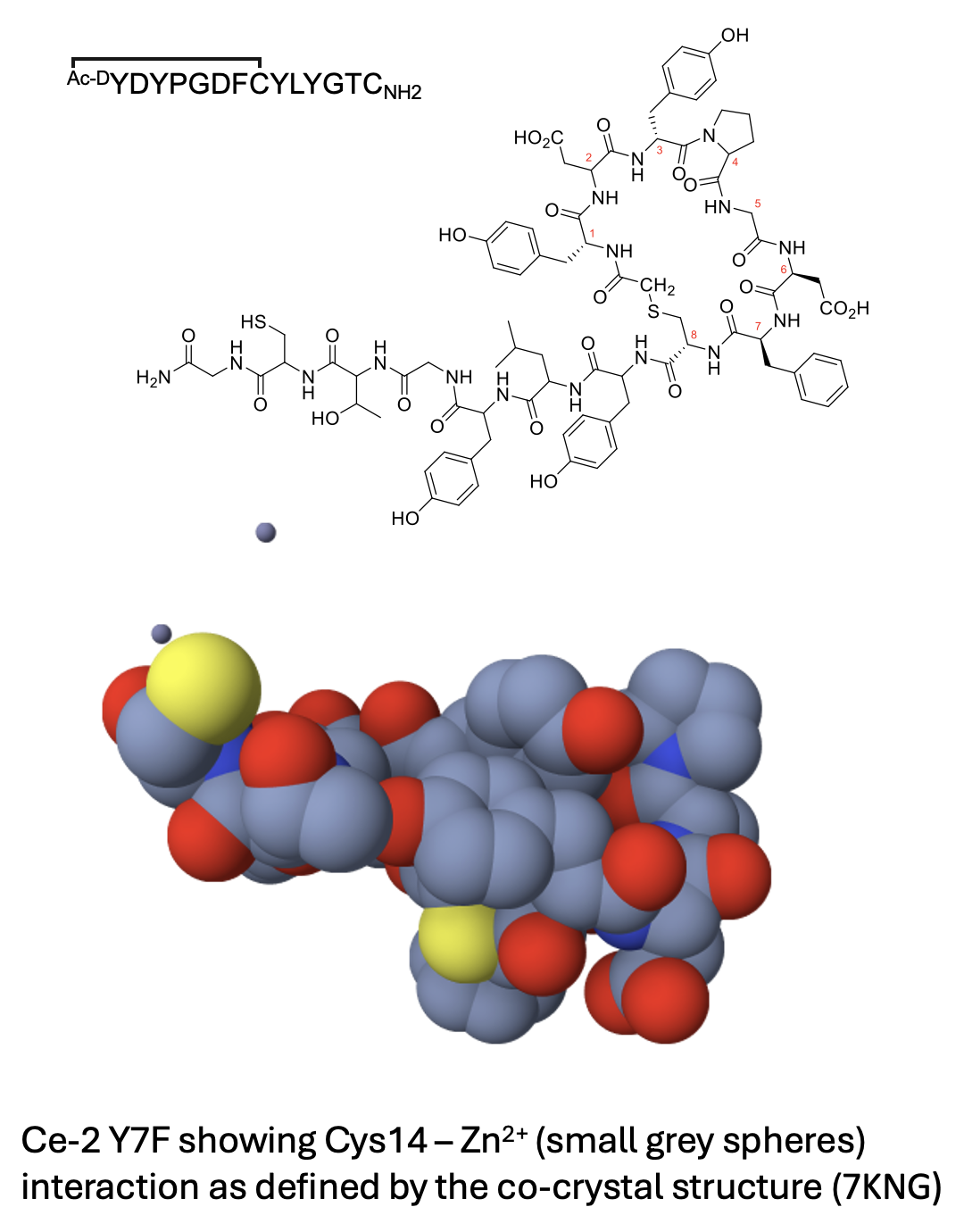

Identifiers
- CAS Number: 2183532-15-0

Chemical and physical data
- Formula: C_{82}H_{102}N_{16}O_{25}S_{2}
- Molar mass: 1775.93 g·mol^{−1}
- 3D model (JSmol): Interactive image
- SMILES: O=C(NC(CC1=CC=C(O)C=C1)C(NC(CC(C)C)C(NC(CC2=CC=C(O)C=C2)C(NCC(NC(C(O)C)C(NC(CS)C(NCC(N)=O)=O)=O)=O)=O)=O)=O)[C@@H]3CSCC(N[C@H](CC4=CC=C(O)C=C4)C(NC(CC(O)=O)C(N[C@H](CC5=CC=C(O)C=C5)C(N6C(CCC6)C(NCC(N[C@@H](CC(O)=O)C(N[C@@H](CC7=CC=CC=C7)C(N3)=O)=O)=O)=O)=O)=O)=O)=O
- InChI: InChI=1S/C82H102N16O25S2/c1-42(2)28-53(73(114)90-54(30-45-11-19-49(100)20-12-45)71(112)85-38-66(106)97-70(43(3)99)81(122)95-61(39-124)72(113)84-36-64(83)104)89-75(116)57(32-47-15-23-51(102)24-16-47)92-79(120)62-40-125-41-67(107)88-55(31-46-13-21-50(101)22-14-46)74(115)93-59(35-69(110)111)78(119)94-60(33-48-17-25-52(103)26-18-48)82(123)98-27-7-10-63(98)80(121)86-37-65(105)87-58(34-68(108)109)77(118)91-56(76(117)96-62)29-44-8-5-4-6-9-44/h4-6,8-9,11-26,42-43,53-63,70,99-103,124H,7,10,27-41H2,1-3H3,(H2,83,104)(H,84,113)(H,85,112)(H,86,121)(H,87,105)(H,88,107)(H,89,116)(H,90,114)(H,91,118)(H,92,120)(H,93,115)(H,94,119)(H,95,122)(H,96,117)(H,97,106)(H,108,109)(H,110,111)/t43?,53?,54?,55-,56+,57?,58+,59?,60-,61?,62+,63?,70?/m1/s1; Key:QOUOZZMBMZASGM-YLFMJWEVSA-N

Ipglycermide Sa-D3
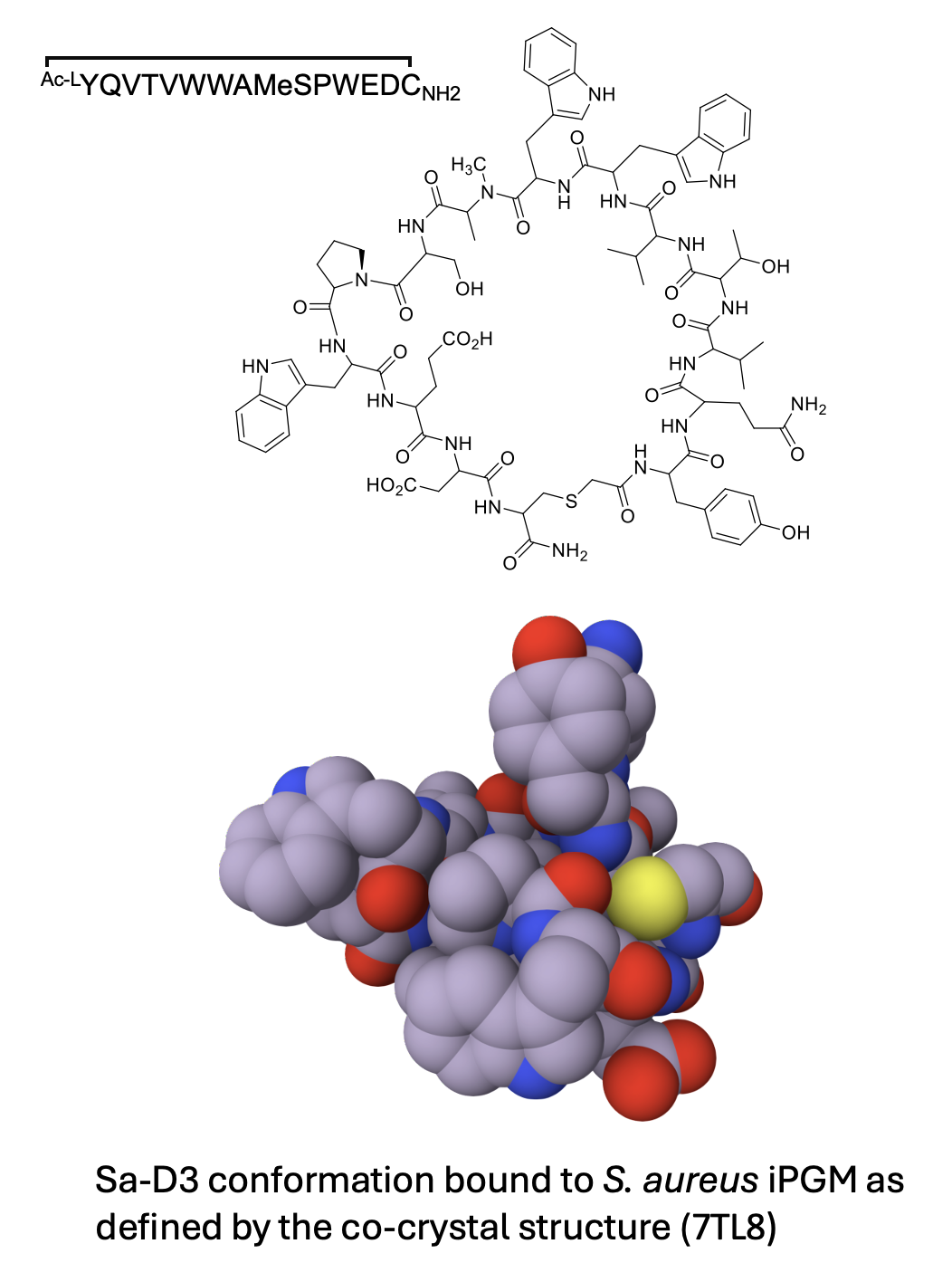

Chemical and physical data
- Formula: C_{87}H_{111}N_{19}O_{23}S
- Molar mass: 1823.02 g·mol^{−1}
- 3D model (JSmol): Interactive image
- SMILES: OC(CC[C@H](NC([C@H](CC1=CNC2=C1C=CC=C2)NC([C@@H]3CCCN3C([C@H](CO)N(C)C([C@@H](NC([C@H](CC4=CNC5=C4C=CC=C5)NC([C@H](CC6=CNC7=C6C=CC=C7)NC([C@H](C(C)C)NC([C@]([H])([C@@H](C)O)NC([C@H](C(C)C)NC([C@H](CCC(N)=O)NC([C@@H](CC8=CC=C(O)C=C8)NC9=O)=O)=O)=O)=O)=O)=O)=O)C)=O)=O)=O)=O)C(N[C@@H](CC(O)=O)C(N[C@@H](CSC9)C(N)=O)=O)=O)=O
- InChI: InChI=1S/C87H111N19O23S/c1-42(2)71-83(125)100-62(34-49-38-92-56-20-13-10-17-53(49)56)80(122)97-60(32-47-36-90-54-18-11-8-15-51(47)54)77(119)93-44(5)86(128)105(7)66(39-107)87(129)106-30-14-21-65(106)82(124)99-61(33-48-37-91-55-19-12-9-16-52(48)55)79(121)96-58(27-29-69(112)113)75(117)98-63(35-70(114)115)81(123)101-64(74(89)116)40-130-41-68(111)94-59(31-46-22-24-50(109)25-23-46)78(120)95-57(26-28-67(88)110)76(118)102-72(43(3)4)84(126)104-73(45(6)108)85(127)103-71/h8-13,15-20,22-25,36-38,42-45,57-66,71-73,90-92,107-109H,14,21,26-35,39-41H2,1-7H3,(H2,88,110)(H2,89,116)(H,93,119)(H,94,111)(H,95,120)(H,96,121)(H,97,122)(H,98,117)(H,99,124)(H,100,125)(H,101,123)(H,102,118)(H,103,127)(H,104,126)(H,112,113)(H,114,115)/t44-,45+,57-,58-,59+,60-,61-,62-,63-,64-,65-,66-,71-,72-,73-/m0/s1; Key:SAOSKVQZJSEQOH-WNZMPMRPSA-N

Ipglycermide Ce-2
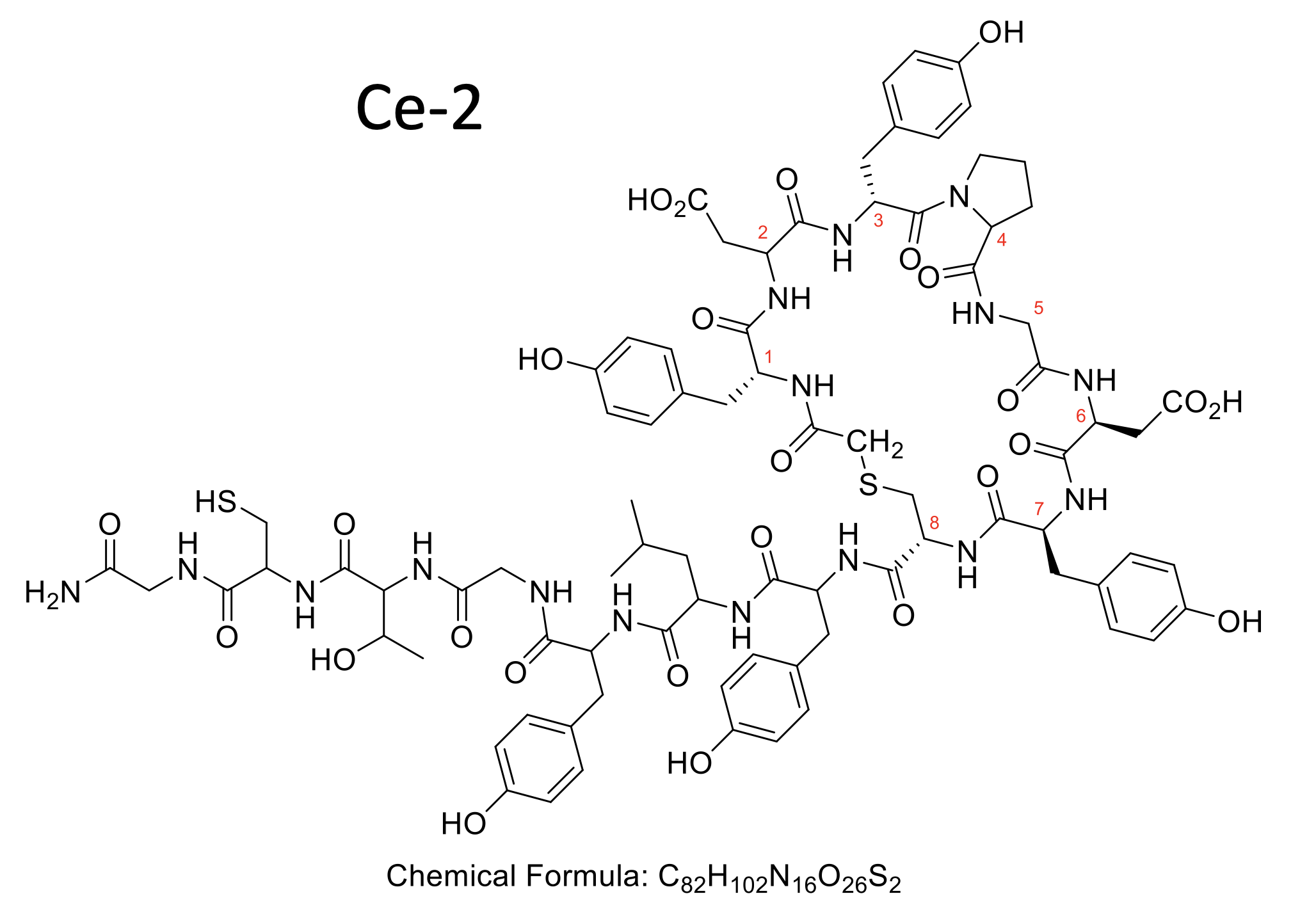

Chemical and physical data
- Formula: C_{82}H_{102}N_{16}O_{26}S_{2}
- Molar mass: 1791.92 g·mol^{−1}
- 3D model (JSmol): Interactive image
- SMILES: O=C(NC(CC1=CC=C(O)C=C1)C(NC(CC(C)C)C(NC(CC2=CC=C(O)C=C2)C(NCC(NC(C(O)C)C(NC(CS)C(NCC(N)=O)=O)=O)=O)=O)=O)=O)[C@@H]3CSCC(N[C@H](CC4=CC=C(O)C=C4)C(NC(CC(O)=O)C(N[C@H](CC5=CC=C(O)C=C5)C(N6C(CCC6)C(NCC(N[C@@H](CC(O)=O)C(N[C@@H](CC7=CC=C(O)C=C7)C(N3)=O)=O)=O)=O)=O)=O)=O)=O
- InChI: InChI=1S/C82H102N16O26S2/c1-41(2)27-53(73(115)90-54(28-43-6-16-48(100)17-7-43)71(113)85-37-66(107)97-70(42(3)99)81(123)95-61(38-125)72(114)84-35-64(83)105)89-75(117)56(30-45-10-20-50(102)21-11-45)92-79(121)62-39-126-40-67(108)88-55(29-44-8-18-49(101)19-9-44)74(116)93-59(34-69(111)112)78(120)94-60(32-47-14-24-52(104)25-15-47)82(124)98-26-4-5-63(98)80(122)86-36-65(106)87-58(33-68(109)110)77(119)91-57(76(118)96-62)31-46-12-22-51(103)23-13-46/h6-25,41-42,53-63,70,99-104,125H,4-5,26-40H2,1-3H3,(H2,83,105)(H,84,114)(H,85,113)(H,86,122)(H,87,106)(H,88,108)(H,89,117)(H,90,115)(H,91,119)(H,92,121)(H,93,116)(H,94,120)(H,95,123)(H,96,118)(H,97,107)(H,109,110)(H,111,112)/t42?,53?,54?,55-,56?,57+,58+,59?,60-,61?,62+,63?,70?/m1/s1; Key:CCYGLVBJNKJTHE-HQXBGBBNSA-N

Ipglycermide Ce-2d
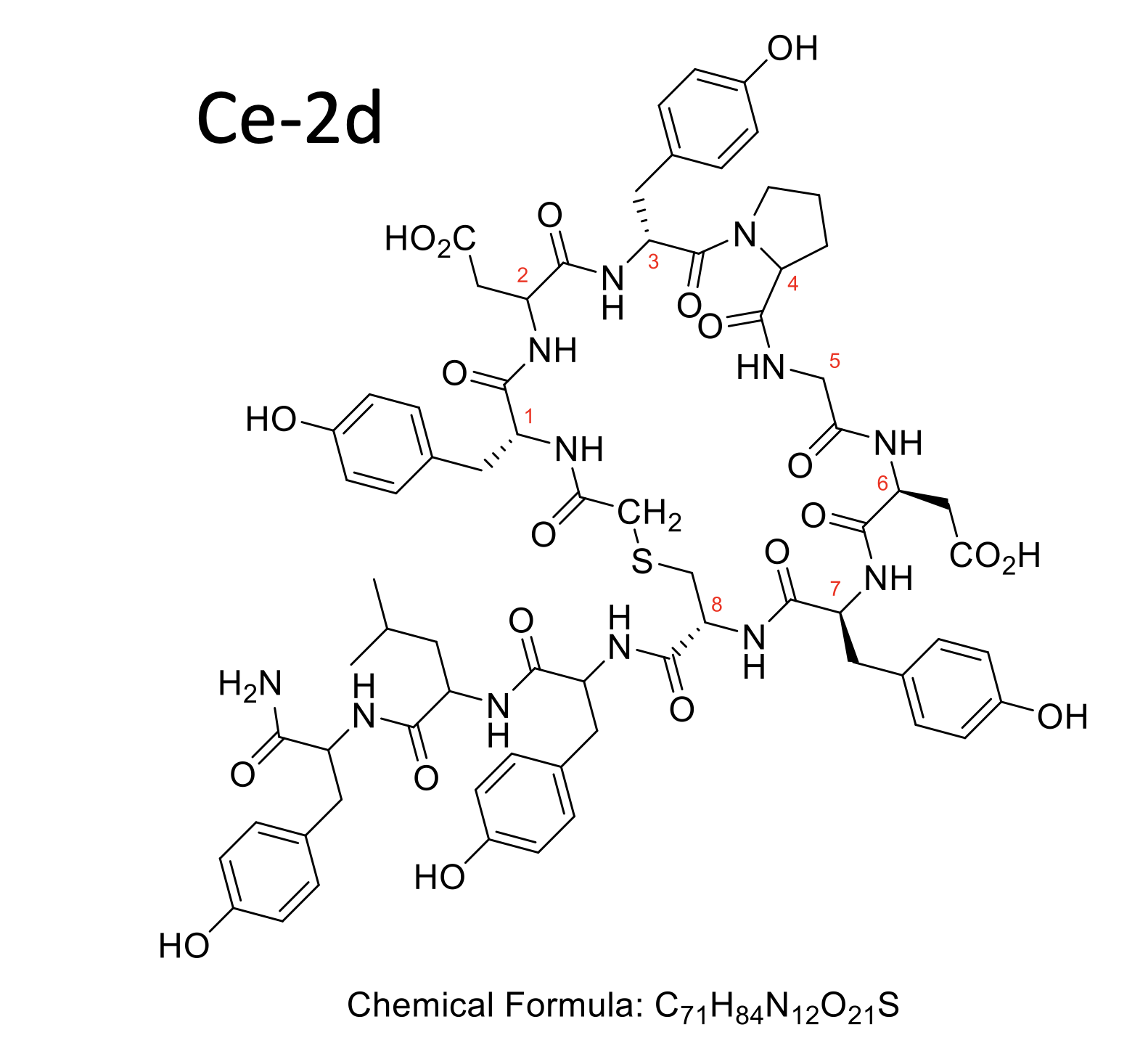

Chemical and physical data
- Formula: C_{71}H_{84}N_{12}O_{21}S
- Molar mass: 1473.58 g·mol^{−1}
- 3D model (JSmol): Interactive image
- SMILES: O=C(NC(CC1=CC=C(O)C=C1)C(NC(CC(C)C)C(NC(CC2=CC=C(O)C=C2)C(N)=O)=O)=O)[C@@H]3CSCC(N[C@H](CC4=CC=C(O)C=C4)C(NC(CC(O)=O)C(N[C@H](CC5=CC=C(O)C=C5)C(N6C(CCC6)C(NCC(N[C@@H](CC(O)=O)C(N[C@@H](CC7=CC=C(O)C=C7)C(N3)=O)=O)=O)=O)=O)=O)=O)=O
- InChI: InChI=1S/C71H84N12O21S/c1-37(2)26-49(63(96)76-48(62(72)95)27-38-5-15-43(84)16-6-38)77-65(98)51(29-40-9-19-45(86)20-10-40)79-69(102)56-35-105-36-59(90)75-50(28-39-7-17-44(85)18-8-39)64(97)80-54(33-61(93)94)68(101)81-55(31-42-13-23-47(88)24-14-42)71(104)83-25-3-4-57(83)70(103)73-34-58(89)74-53(32-60(91)92)67(100)78-52(66(99)82-56)30-41-11-21-46(87)22-12-41/h5-24,37,48-57,84-88H,3-4,25-36H2,1-2H3,(H2,72,95)(H,73,103)(H,74,89)(H,75,90)(H,76,96)(H,77,98)(H,78,100)(H,79,102)(H,80,97)(H,81,101)(H,82,99)(H,91,92)(H,93,94)/t48?,49?,50-,51?,52+,53+,54?,55-,56+,57?/m1/s1; Key:TYCBRAQFWUEKIU-XNCJSVDVSA-N

Ipglycermide Ce-1 NHOH
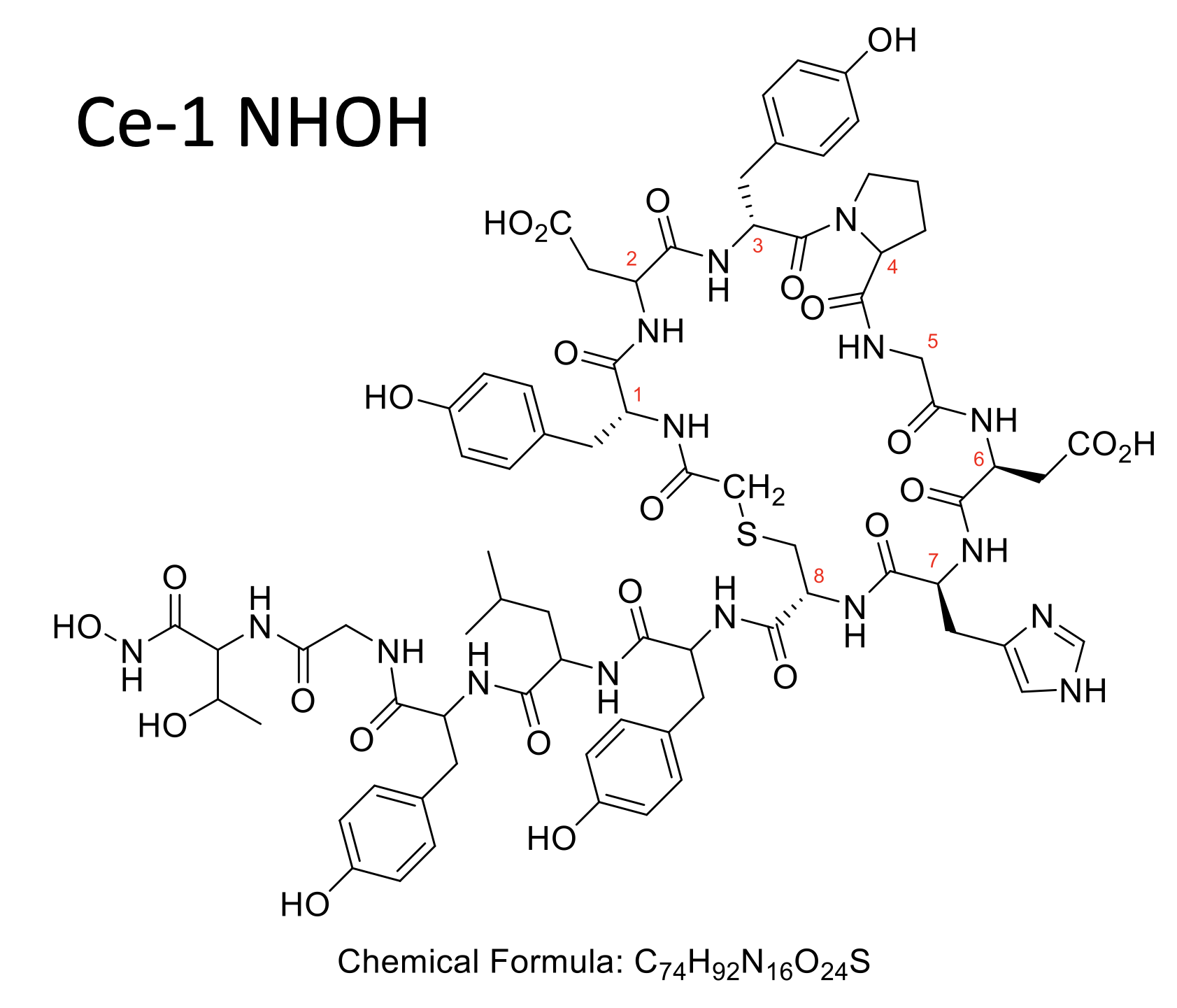

Chemical and physical data
- Formula: C_{74}H_{92}N_{16}O_{24}S
- Molar mass: 1621.70 g·mol^{−1}
- 3D model (JSmol): Interactive image
- SMILES: O=C(NC(CC1=CC=C(O)C=C1)C(NC(CC(C)C)C(NC(CC2=CC=C(O)C=C2)C(NCC(NC(C(O)C)C(NO)=O)=O)=O)=O)=O)[C@@H]3CSCC(N[C@H](CC4=CC=C(O)C=C4)C(NC(CC(O)=O)C(N[C@H](CC5=CC=C(O)C=C5)C(N6C(CCC6)C(NCC(N[C@@H](CC(O)=O)C(N[C@@H](CC7=CNC=N7)C(N3)=O)=O)=O)=O)=O)=O)=O)=O
- InChI: InChI=1S/C74H92N16O24S/c1-37(2)23-48(65(104)82-49(24-39-6-14-44(92)15-7-39)64(103)76-33-59(97)88-63(38(3)91)73(112)89-114)81-67(106)51(26-41-10-18-46(94)19-11-41)83-71(110)56-34-115-35-60(98)80-50(25-40-8-16-45(93)17-9-40)66(105)85-54(30-62(101)102)70(109)86-55(27-42-12-20-47(95)21-13-42)74(113)90-22-4-5-57(90)72(111)77-32-58(96)79-53(29-61(99)100)69(108)84-52(68(107)87-56)28-43-31-75-36-78-43/h6-21,31,36-38,48-57,63,91-95,114H,4-5,22-30,32-35H2,1-3H3,(H,75,78)(H,76,103)(H,77,111)(H,79,96)(H,80,98)(H,81,106)(H,82,104)(H,83,110)(H,84,108)(H,85,105)(H,86,109)(H,87,107)(H,88,97)(H,89,112)(H,99,100)(H,101,102)/t38?,48?,49?,50-,51?,52+,53+,54?,55-,56+,57?,63?/m1/s1; Key:OWTWBDAHWRNQBU-IVVJNDPGSA-N

Ipglycermide Sa-D2
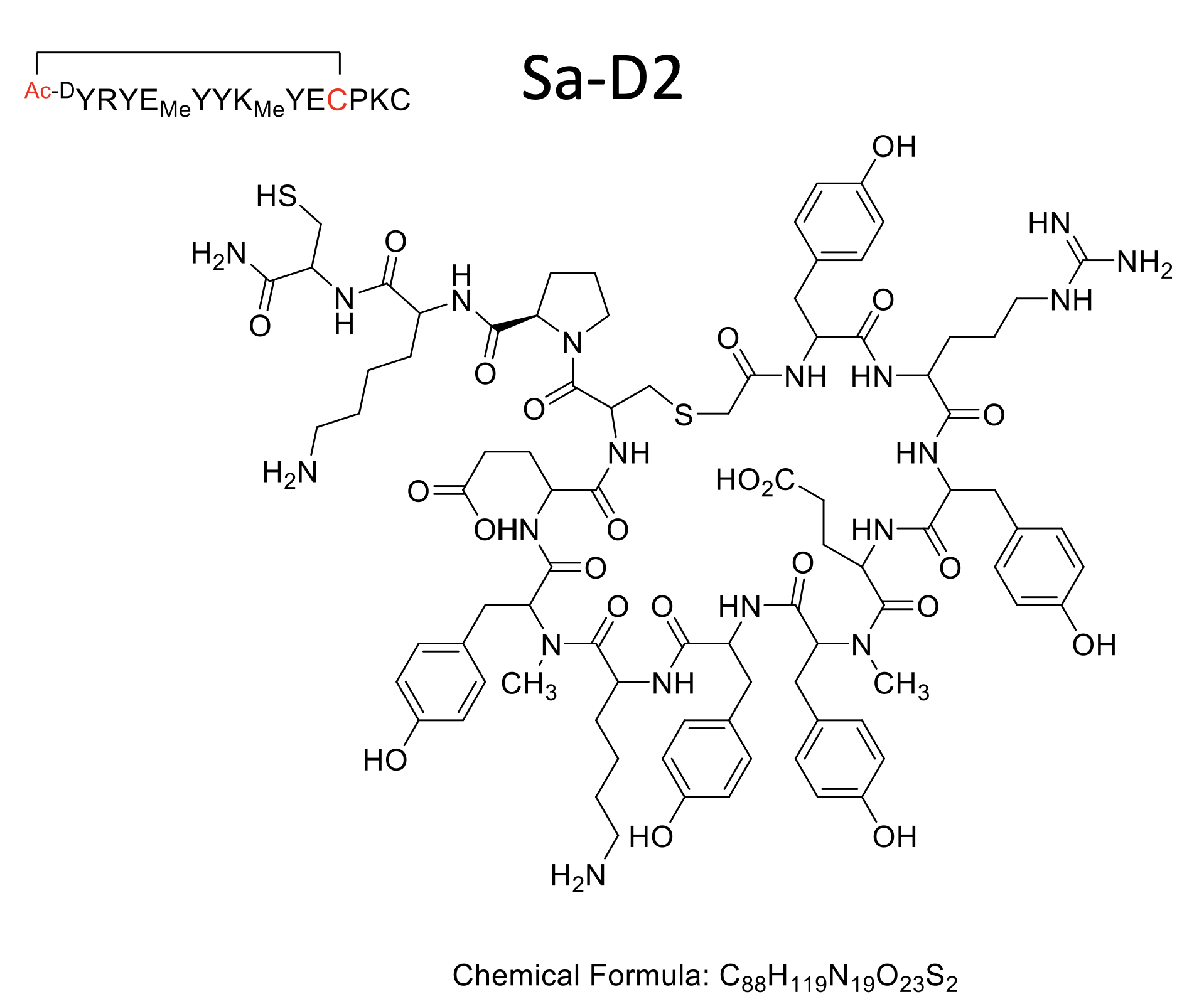

Chemical and physical data
- Formula: C_{88}H_{119}N_{19}O_{23}S_{2}
- Molar mass: 1875.15 g·mol^{−1}
- 3D model (JSmol): Interactive image
- SMILES: O=C(NC(CC1=CC=C(O)C=C1)C(NC(CC(C)C)C(NC(CC2=CC=C(O)C=C2)C(N)=O)=O)=O)[C@@H]3CSCC(N[C@H](CC4=CC=C(O)C=C4)C(NC(CC(O)=O)C(N[C@H](CC5=CC=C(O)C=C5)C(N6C(CCC6)C(NCC(N[C@@H](CC(O)=O)C(N[C@@H](CC7=CC=C(O)C=C7)C(N3)=O)=O)=O)=O)=O)=O)=O)=O
- InChI: InChI=1S/C71H84N12O21S/c1-37(2)26-49(63(96)76-48(62(72)95)27-38-5-15-43(84)16-6-38)77-65(98)51(29-40-9-19-45(86)20-10-40)79-69(102)56-35-105-36-59(90)75-50(28-39-7-17-44(85)18-8-39)64(97)80-54(33-61(93)94)68(101)81-55(31-42-13-23-47(88)24-14-42)71(104)83-25-3-4-57(83)70(103)73-34-58(89)74-53(32-60(91)92)67(100)78-52(66(99)82-56)30-41-11-21-46(87)22-12-41/h5-24,37,48-57,84-88H,3-4,25-36H2,1-2H3,(H2,72,95)(H,73,103)(H,74,89)(H,75,90)(H,76,96)(H,77,98)(H,78,100)(H,79,102)(H,80,97)(H,81,101)(H,82,99)(H,91,92)(H,93,94)/t48?,49?,50-,51?,52+,53+,54?,55-,56+,57?/m1/s1; Key:TYCBRAQFWUEKIU-XNCJSVDVSA-N

Ipglycermides are a class of non-natural macrocyclic peptide (MCP) inhibitors that target cofactor-independent phosphoglycerate mutases (iPGMs). The activity of human phosphoglycerate mutase requires the cofactor 2,3-bisphosphoglycerate (dPGM), whereas a structurally unrelated isozyme found in many parasitic species functions without a cofactor (iPGM). This variation in mechanism and evolutionary origin presents a potential drug target for selectively inhibiting glycolysis in pathogenic organisms. Specifically, they have shown promise in fighting filarial (round worm) diseases such as those caused by Brugia malayi, Onchocerca volvulus, and Dirofilaria immitis (heartworm).

Ipglycermides are composed of 14 amino acids and contain an 8-membered macrocycle formed through a thioether bridge connecting the D-Tyr1 α-acetamide and Cys8 sulfhydryl side chain. Compared to most small-molecule drugs, there are more interactions with the drug target that allow them to work at significantly lower concentrations.

== Motivation ==
Nature has evolved cyclic peptides for signaling and host defense. These molecules have therapeutic applications, including use as antibiotics (e.g., vancomycin, bacitracin), immunosuppressants (e.g., ciclosporin), and chemotherapeutics (e.g., romidepsin). The constrained structure of cyclic peptides compared to linear peptides can enhance potency and stability. Advances in synthetic cyclic peptide libraries and in vitro affinity-based selection methods have enabled their development as templates for drug discovery and other applications. Despite progress in identifying synthetic cyclic peptides with high affinity and selectivity, challenges remain in achieving cell permeability and metabolic stability, which continue to be areas of active research.

== Discovery ==
These high-affinity molecules were discovered using affinity selection from an RNA-encoded MCP library having a theoretical size of trillions of members, though in practice the numbers are several orders of magnitude lower. However, this is still significantly larger than anything possible with standard small molecule chemical libraries typically applied in high throughput screening (HTS).

The initially RaPID-selected ipglycermides using C. elegans iPGM as the selection target were Ce-1 and Ce-2, 14 amino acid cyclic lariat peptides containing an 8-member peptide ring and a six amino acid linear sequence terminating in Cy14. Ce-1 and Ce-2 differed by a single amino acid at position 7, histidine vs. tyrosine, respectively. Subsequent sequence activity relationship studies demonstrated that additional amino acid sequence variation was possible suggesting that the initially identified Ce-1 and Ce-2 reflected a fraction of the potential library size and diversity. The limited number of ipglycermides initially identified may reflect the restricted library size, selection efficiency, or a combination of both.

Ipglycermides bind at the interface of the iPGM phosphotransferase and phosphatase domains as revealed in several co-crystal structures obtained with C. elegans (5KGN, 7KNF, 7KNG, 7TL7) and Staphylococcus aureus (7TL8) iPGMs and a variety of ipglycermides. Lariate ipglycermides containing either a terminal cysteine or hydroxamic acid have sub-nanomolar affinity for C. elegans iPGM, while truncated analogs, such as ipglycermide Ce-2d bind potently in the low nanomolar range.

== Co-crystal structures ==
iPGM apo structures (2) and five ipglycermide co-crystal structures have been determined by the Protein Structure and X-ray Crystallography Laboratory (PSXL) of Dr. Scott Lovell at the University of Kansas (PDB IDs):

Structural data for independent phosphoglycerate mutase
PDB ID	Resolution (Å)	Description	Reference
5KGL	2.45	Apo independent phosphoglycerate mutase from C. elegans (orthorhombic form)	
5KGM	2.95	Apo independent phosphoglycerate mutase from C. elegans (monoclinic form)	
5KGN	1.95	Independent phosphoglycerate mutase from C. elegans in complex with a macrocyclic peptide inhibitor (2d)	
7KNF	1.80	Independent phosphoglycerate mutase from C. elegans in complex with a macrocyclic peptide inhibitor (Ce-1 NHOH)	
7KNG	2.10	Independent phosphoglycerate mutase from C. elegans in complex with a macrocyclic peptide inhibitor (Ce-2 Y7F)	
7TL7	1.90	Independent phosphoglycerate mutase from C. elegans in complex with a macrocyclic peptide inhibitor (Sa-D2)	
7TL8	1.95	Independent phosphoglycerate mutase from Staphylococcus aureus in complex with a macrocyclic peptide inhibitor (Sa-D3).	

== Mechanism of action ==
Ipglycermides bind at the interface of the iPGM phosphotransferase and phosphatase domains as revealed in several co-crystal structures obtained with C. elegans (5KGN, 7KNF, 7KNG, 7TL7) and Staphylococcus aureus (7TL8) iPGMs and a variety of ipglycermides. Lariate ipglycermides containing either a terminal cysteine or hydroxamic acid have sub-nanomolar affinity for C. elegans iPGM, while truncated analogs, such as ipglycermide Ce-2d bind potently in the low nanomolar range.

== Chemical synthesis ==
Ipglycermides are readily synthesized using automated solid phase peptide synthesis and incorporate the thioether macrocycle linkage via cyclization achieved between a free cysteine thiol and N-chloroacetyl containing tyrosine.
