= Ted Schaefer =

Canadian chemist

- Born: 22 July 1933; Gnadenthal, Manitoba, Canada
- Died: 15 September 2007 (aged 74); Winnipeg, Manitoba, Canada
- Citizenship: Canadian
- Education: University of Manitoba; University of Oxford
- Known for: Ultra-high resolution NMR; Interpretation of NMR parameters; Long-range and proximate spin-spin coupling constants; Molecular conformations and internal motions
- Spouse: Nicola Caroline Sewell (m.1960)
- Children: three
- Awards: FRSC (1973); FCIC (1973); Noranda Award (1973); Gerhard Herzberg Award (1975); DSc (1982); CM (2002)
- Scientific career
- Fields: Chemistry, NMR spectroscopy
- Workplaces: University of Manitoba
- Thesis: Some Chemical Applications of Nuclear Magnetic Resonance
- Doctoral advisor: Rex Richards

Theodore (Ted) Peter Schaefer, CM FRSC (22 July 1933 – 15 September 2007) was a Canadian physical chemist and professor whose research focused on high resolution nuclear magnetic resonance (NMR) spectroscopy to investigate conformation and internal motions in highly flexible molecules.

== Early life and education ==
Schaefer was born to Paul Jakob Schaefer (1892-1969), a teacher, school principal, and pastor; and his wife Margarethe (née Wiebe) (1897-1948) in the pioneer hamlet of Gnadenthal, Manitoba. He was educated at the historic Gnadenthal School and at Mennonite Collegiate Institute.

Schaefer learned the classical aspects of chemistry at the University of Manitoba, where he earned a Bachelor of Science with honours and a Master of Science under the supervision of Alan Newton Campbell, a dedicated researcher in the field of electrochemistry and phase rule. Schaefer’s thesis was entitled, “The Room Temperature Isotherm of the System Lead-Indium-Tin”.

Awarded a Royal Dutch Shell postgraduate scholarship to attend Lincoln College, Oxford, Schaefer performed graduate research in the emerging field of NMR spectroscopy in the laboratory of Rex Richards, where his fellow graduate students included Ray Freeman. Schaefer’s doctoral research included building a 29.92 MHz spectrometer with which he performed some of the first high-resolution NMR and solid-state NMR experiments. His thesis was entitled, “Some Chemical Applications of Nuclear Magnetic Resonance”. He received his Doctor of Philosophy (DPhil) in 1958.

== Career ==
Schaefer accepted a faculty position in 1958 and began to establish a research laboratory in the chemistry department at the University of Manitoba, where he spent his entire academic career.

Before he was able to establish an NMR laboratory at the University of Manitoba, Schaefer spent summers working with William G. Schneider and A. David Buckingham on the interpretation of chemical shifts at the National Research Council of Canada (NRCC) (1959), and with John Pople on the spectroscopic analysis of nuclear spin systems at the National Physical Laboratory (NPL) (1960). Richards and Schaefer introduced the use of a prime symbol to differentiate between magnetically inequivalent nuclei in Pople notation for second-order spin coupling systems.

Schaefer’s early research at the University of Manitoba focused on the analysis of high-resolution ^{1}H and ^{19}F spectra, the interpretation of chemical shifts and indirect nuclear spin-spin coupling constants (J-coupling), and solvent effects on these parameters. He continued his collaborations with Schneider at NRCC (1962), with Pople at NPL (1964), and with Steven S. Danyluk at Argonne National Laboratory (1967, 1968).

Beginning in the early 1970s, Schaefer’s research group combined NMR studies with the semi-empirical (CNDO/2, INDO) and ab initio quantum chemistry methods introduced by Pople and his collaborators. He was among the first to apply quantum chemical calculations to the interpretation of NMR parameters for the study of hindered internal rotation and conformational preferences.

Schaefer published over 300 research papers in peer-reviewed journals, including about 235 papers in the Canadian Journal of Chemistry. His works spanned the analysis of high-resolution spectra, the interpretation of NMR parameters, solvent effects, stereospecific and proximate nuclear spin-spin coupling, intramolecular hydrogen bonding, and molecular conformational structure and energetics in solution. His development of the “J method” provides a means to determine barriers to internal rotation for small molecules in solution.

During his 40-year career at the University of Manitoba, Schaefer established and directed a research program in NMR spectroscopy in which visiting scientists, postdoctoral research fellows, technicians, undergraduates, and some 30 graduate students participated. He was also a member or chair of several committees for scientific organizations, including the National Research Council of Canada and the Council of the Natural Sciences and Engineering Research Council of Canada.

== Awards and honours ==
In 1973, Schaefer received the Noranda Award from the Chemical Institute of Canada, was appointed a Fellow in the Chemical Institute of Canada (FCIC) and was elected a Fellow of the Royal Society of Canada (FRSC). His RSC citation notes that he "made basic contributions to correlation studies of magnetic resonance parameters with electron density, ionization potential and electronegativity." Schaefer received The Gerhard Herzberg Award from the Canadian Society for Analytical Sciences and Spectroscopy (formerly The Spectroscopy Society of Canada) in 1975 and the Graduate Teaching Award from the University of Manitoba Graduate Students’ Association in 1980. In 1982, he was awarded an honorary Doctor of Science (DSc) by the University of Winnipeg and appointed a Distinguished Professor by the University of Manitoba, a title which he held until his retirement in 1997. He was appointed a Distinguished Professor Emeritus in 2004.

In 2002, Schaefer received Queen Elizabeth II's Golden Jubilee Medal and was appointed a Member of the Order of Canada (CM). His citation reads,

An eminent researcher and scholar in the field of spectroscopy, Theodore Schaefer is University Distinguished Professor at the University of Manitoba. His many seminal papers helped to establish nuclear magnetic resonance as one of the most important techniques available in chemistry and structural biology. The recipient of numerous awards and honours, he is a Fellow of both the Royal Society of Canada and the Chemical Institute of Canada. Generous with his time, he served on numerous committees of the Natural Sciences and Engineering Research Council of Canada. His commitment and passion for chemistry have inspired countless young scientists.

== Personal life ==
Schaefer married Nicola Caroline Sewell in 1960. They had three children: Catherine, Dominic, and Benjamin.
