= Pople (disambiguation) =

Pople is a surname.

Pople may also refer to:

- Several nuclear chemistry terms named for John Pople, British theoretical chemist and 1998 Nobel laureate in chemistry
  - Pariser–Parr–Pople method, a way of making quantitative predictions of electronic structures
  - Pople diagram, a diagram which describes the relationship between various calculation methods in computational chemistry
  - Pople-Nesbet equations, a way of describing molecular electron orbits
  - Pople notation, a method of notating spin coupling systems in nuclear magnetic resonance
