= Gaussian (software) =

Computational chemistry software

- Original authors: W. J. Hehre, W. A. Lathan, R. Ditchfield, M. D. Newton, John Pople
- Developers: Pople Research Group at Carnegie Mellon University; Gaussian, Inc.
- Release: 1970; 56 years ago
- Stable release: Gaussian 16 / 2017; 9 years ago
- License: Proprietary
- Website: www.gaussian.com

Gaussian /ˈɡaʊs.i.ən/ is a general purpose computational chemistry software package initially released in 1970 by John Pople and his research group at Carnegie Mellon University as Gaussian 70. It has been continuously updated since then. The name originates from Pople's use of Gaussian orbitals to speed up molecular electronic structure calculations as opposed to using Slater-type orbitals, a choice made to improve performance on the limited computing capacities of then-current computer hardware for Hartree–Fock calculations. The current version of the program is Gaussian 16. Originally available through the Quantum Chemistry Program Exchange, it was later licensed out of Carnegie Mellon University, and since 1987 has been developed and licensed by Gaussian, Inc.

== Standard abilities ==
According to the most recent Gaussian manual, the package can do:

- Molecular mechanics
  - AMBER
  - Universal force field (UFF)
  - DREIDING force field
- Semi-empirical quantum chemistry method calculations
  - Austin Model 1 (AM1), PM3, CNDO, INDO, MINDO/3, MNDO
- Self-consistent field (SCF methods)
  - Hartree–Fock method: restricted, unrestricted, and restricted open-shell
- Møller–Plesset perturbation theory (MP2, MP3, MP4, MP5).
- Built-in density functional theory (DFT) methods
  - B3LYP and other hybrid functionals
  - Exchange functionals: PBE, MPW, PW91, Slater, X-alpha, Gill96, TPSS.
  - Correlation functionals: PBE, TPSS, VWN, PW91, LYP, PL, P86, B95
- ONIOM (QM/MM method) up to three layers
- Complete active space (CAS) and multi-configurational self-consistent field calculations
- Coupled cluster calculations
- Quadratic configuration interaction (QCI) methods
- Quantum chemistry composite methods – CBS-QB3, CBS-4, CBS-Q, CBS-Q/APNO, G1, G2, G3, W1 high-accuracy methods

== Official release history ==
Gaussian 70, Gaussian 76, Gaussian 80, Gaussian 82, Gaussian 86, Gaussian 88, Gaussian 90, Gaussian 92, Gaussian 92/DFT, Gaussian 94, Gaussian 98, Gaussian 03, Gaussian 09, and Gaussian 16.

Other programs named 'Gaussian XX' were placed among the holdings of the Quantum Chemistry Program Exchange. These were unofficial, unverified ports of the program to other computer platforms.

== License controversy ==
In the past, Gaussian, Inc. has attracted controversy for its licensing terms that stipulate that researchers who develop competing software packages are not permitted to use the software. Some scientists consider these terms overly restrictive. The anonymous group bannedbygaussian.org has published a list of scientists whom it claims are not permitted to use GAUSSIAN software. These assertions were repeated by Jim Giles in 2004 in Nature. The controversy was also noted in 1999 by Chemical and Engineering News (repeated without additional content in 2004), and in 2000, the World Association of Theoretically Oriented Chemists Scientific Board held a referendum of its executive board members on this issue with a majority (23 of 28) approving the resolution opposing the restrictive licenses.

Gaussian, Inc. disputes the accuracy of these descriptions of its policy and actions, noting that all of the listed institutions do in fact have licenses for everyone but directly competing researchers. They also claim that not licensing competitors is standard practice in the software industry and members of the Gaussian collaboration community have been refused licenses from competing institutions.

== See also ==
- List of quantum chemistry and solid-state physics software
