= William J. Pietro =

American/Canadian research chemist

William Joseph Pietro (born 1956) is an American/Canadian research scientist working in quantum chemistry, molecular electronics, and molecular machines.

== Education ==
Pietro was born in Jersey City, New Jersey. His education includes a B.S. in chemistry from the Brooklyn Polytechnic Institute of New York, a Ph.D. in chemistry from the University of California, Irvine, and a postdoctoral fellowship at Northwestern University.

== Career ==
Pietro was one of the founding authors of both Gaussian and Spartan electronic structure software packages. Pietro and co-workers Robert Hout and Warren Hehre invented the first algorithm for the high-resolution visualization of molecular orbitals. Working in collaboration with John Pople and Warren Hehre, Pietro developed the first split-valence basis sets for transition metals and higher-row main-group elements.

Between 1985 and 1991, Pietro was a professor of chemistry at the University of Wisconsin–Madison, where his research group pioneered the first working molecular diode.

Pietro is a professor of chemistry at York University researching theoretical aspects of electron transfer reactions in transition metal complexes. and the quantum dynamics of molecular and biomolecular machines.
