= Quantum Chemistry Program Exchange =

Historical chemistry organization

The Quantum Chemistry Program Exchange (QCPE) was an organization located at Indiana University Bloomington from 1963 to 2007. It was devoted to the distribution of computational chemistry software before electronic file transfer on the internet became a widely available method of software distribution. The QCPE was founded by Prof. Harrison Shull and was managed by Richard Counts for most of its existence. Financial support for the QCPE was originally provided by the Air Force Office of Scientific Research until 1969. Funding continued under an interim grant from the National Science Foundation in 1971, until it became financially self-sustaining in 1973.

The QCPE maintained a catalog of software that expanded through regular contributions from chemistry software developers. New software contributions were announced through a quarterly QCPE Newsletter that were eventually formalized into a QCPE Bulletin in 1981, which allowed for software citations to numbered software entries in the Bulletin that announced their release. QCPE members paid for subscriptions to the Newsletter/Bulletin and additionally paid a processing and delivery fee to receive software from the QCPE catalog. The software distribution options expanded alongside technological development, starting from punched cards and magnetic tape drives delivered by mail, before adopting floppy disks and CD-ROMs, and eventually electronic delivery by FTP. The QCPE grew rapidly in its early days, with about 400 members and a catalog of nearly 100 programs after its first 3 years of operation. In the 1980s and early 1990s, the QCPE also organized annual summer workshops to train scientists in the use of its more popular software. At its peak in the mid-1980s, the QCPE had over 2000 members, over 400 programs available, and an annual income of nearly $400,000.

The most visible legacy of the QCPE is the thousands of software citations to the QCPE Bulletin in scientific publications over four decades, with a peak of over 1000 per year in the early 1990s. The most popular software in the early days of the QCPE was GAUSSIAN (QCPE #236, #368, #406) before it was removed from the QCPE catalog to become commercial software, and the most popular software in its later years was MOPAC (QCPE #455, #688, #689). Other popular software distributed by the QCPE included POLYATOM (QCPE #47, #199), CNDO/2 (QCPE #91), AMPAC (QCPE #506), CRYSTAL (QCPE #577), Molden (QCPE #619), and MM2 / MM3 (QCPE #690-#698).
