= ONIOM =

The ONIOM (short for 'Our own N-layered Integrated molecular Orbital and Molecular mechanics') method is a computational approach developed by Keiji Morokuma and co-workers. ONIOM is a hybrid method that enables different ab initio, semi-empirical, or molecular mechanics methods to be applied to different parts of a molecule/system in combination to produce reliable geometry and energy at reduced computational cost.

The ONIOM computational approach has been found to be particularly useful for modeling biomolecular systems as well as for transition metal complexes and catalysts.

== Codes that support ONIOM ==
- Gaussian
- NWChem
- ORCA (quantum chemistry program)

== See also ==
- QM/MM
- Steric effects (ONIOM to separate Steric effects vs. electronic effects)
