= Index of physics articles (Z) =

The index of physics articles is split into multiple pages due to its size.

To navigate by individual letter use the table of contents below.

== Z ==
- Z' boson
- Z(4430)
- Z-pinch
- ZEPLIN-III
- ZETA (fusion reactor)
- ZEUS (particle detector)
- ZINDO
- ZPPR
- Zakharov system
- Zakharov–Schulman system
- Zastruga
- Zeeman effect
- Zeitschrift für Angewandte Mathematik und Physik
- Zeitschrift für Physik C
- Zeldovich pancake
- Zemax
- Zero-dispersion wavelength
- Zero-energy universe
- Zero-lift drag coefficient
- Zero-mode waveguide
- Zero-phonon line and phonon sideband
- Zero-point energy
- Zero differential overlap
- Zero gravity (disambiguation)
- Zero lift axis
- Zero sound
- Zeroth law of thermodynamics
- Zeta function regularization
- Zevatron
- Ze'ev Lev
- Zhang Jie (scientist)
- Zhao Jiuzhang
- Zhores Alferov
- Zhou Guangzhao
- Zhou Peiyuan
- Zhu Guangya
- Zhurnal Eksperimental'noi i Teoreticheskoi Fiziki
- Zia Mian
- Zimm–Bragg model
- Zinc sulfide
- Zinovii Shulman
- Zip-cord
- Zirconium alloy
- Zitterbewegung
- Zoltán Lajos Bay
- Zonal and poloidal
- Zonal flow (plasma)
- Zone melting
- Zone plate
- Zone valve
- Zoé (reactor)
- Z Pulsed Power Facility
- Zsolt Bor
- Zubbles
- Zygmunt Florenty Wróblewski
- Zénobe Gramme
