= Pople =

The Pople surname is associated with Pophills in Salford Priors, Warwickshire. It is also linked to a lost place name, Pophall, in Linchmere, Sussex. The name is of English origin, alternatively derived from the Old French word "pople" meaning poplar tree, indicating a connection to places with poplar trees. Notable people with this surname include:

- Anthony Pople (1955–2003), British musicologist and writer
- John Pople (1925–2004), British theoretical chemist and Nobel laureate
- Luke Pople (born 1991), Australian wheelchair basketball player
- Robert Pople (1836–1909), British publican and Mayor of Exeter
- Rodney Pople (born 1952), Australian visual artist
- Ross Pople (born 1945), New Zealand-born British conductor and classical cellist

== See also ==
- Pople (disambiguation)
