= JCBC =

JCBC may refer to:

- Jatayu Conservation Breeding Centre, Pinjore, Haryana state, India
- Jesus College Boat Club (Cambridge)
- Jesus College Boat Club (Oxford)
- Junior College of Broward County, the original name of Broward College in Fort Lauderdale, Florida
- Journal of Computational Biophysics and Chemistry
