= JTCC =

JTCC may refer to:

- Japanese Touring Car Championship
- Junior Tennis Champions Center - tennis training center in College Park, Maryland
- Journal of Theoretical and Computational Chemistry
- Brightpoint Community College, formerly John Tyler Community College
