= NWChem =

- Developer: Pacific Northwest National Laboratory
- Stable release: 7.3.1 / November 6, 2025
- Repository: https://github.com/nwchemgit/nwchem
- Written in: Fortran
- Operating system: Linux, FreeBSD, Unix and like operating systems, macOS, Microsoft Windows
- Platform: x86-64, AArch64, ppc64le, RISC-V, x86, ARM32
- Type: Computational Chemistry
- License: Educational Community License 2.0
- Website: https://nwchemgit.github.io/

NWChem is an ab initio computational chemistry software package which includes quantum chemical and molecular dynamics functionality. It was designed to run on high-performance parallel supercomputers as well as conventional workstation clusters. It aims to be scalable both in its ability to treat large problems efficiently, and in its usage of available parallel computing resources. NWChem has been developed by the Molecular Sciences Software group of the Theory, Modeling & Simulation program of the Environmental Molecular Sciences Laboratory (EMSL) at the Pacific Northwest National Laboratory (PNNL). The early implementation was funded by the EMSL Construction Project.

NWChem is currently being redesigned and reimplemented for exascale computing platforms (NWChemEx).

== Capabilities ==
- Molecular mechanics
- Molecular dynamics
- Hartree–Fock (self-consistent field method)
- Density functional theory
- Time-dependent density functional theory
- Post-Hartree–Fock methods, including MP2 in the resolution of identity approximation (RI-MP2), multiconfigurational self-consistent-field (MCSCF) theory, selected configuration interaction (CI), Møller–Plesset perturbation theory (MP2, MP3, MP4), configuration interaction (CISD, CISDT, CISDTQ), and coupled cluster theory (CCSD, CCSDT, CCSDTQ, EOMCCSD, EOMCCSDT, EOMCCSDTQ). The Tensor Contraction Engine, or TCE, provides most of the functionality for the correlated methods, and can be used to develop additional many-body methods using a Python interface. A full list of approximate coupled-cluster methods is available on the website.
- QM/MM
- ONIOM
