= Rudolph Pariser =

American theoretical chemist (1923–2021)

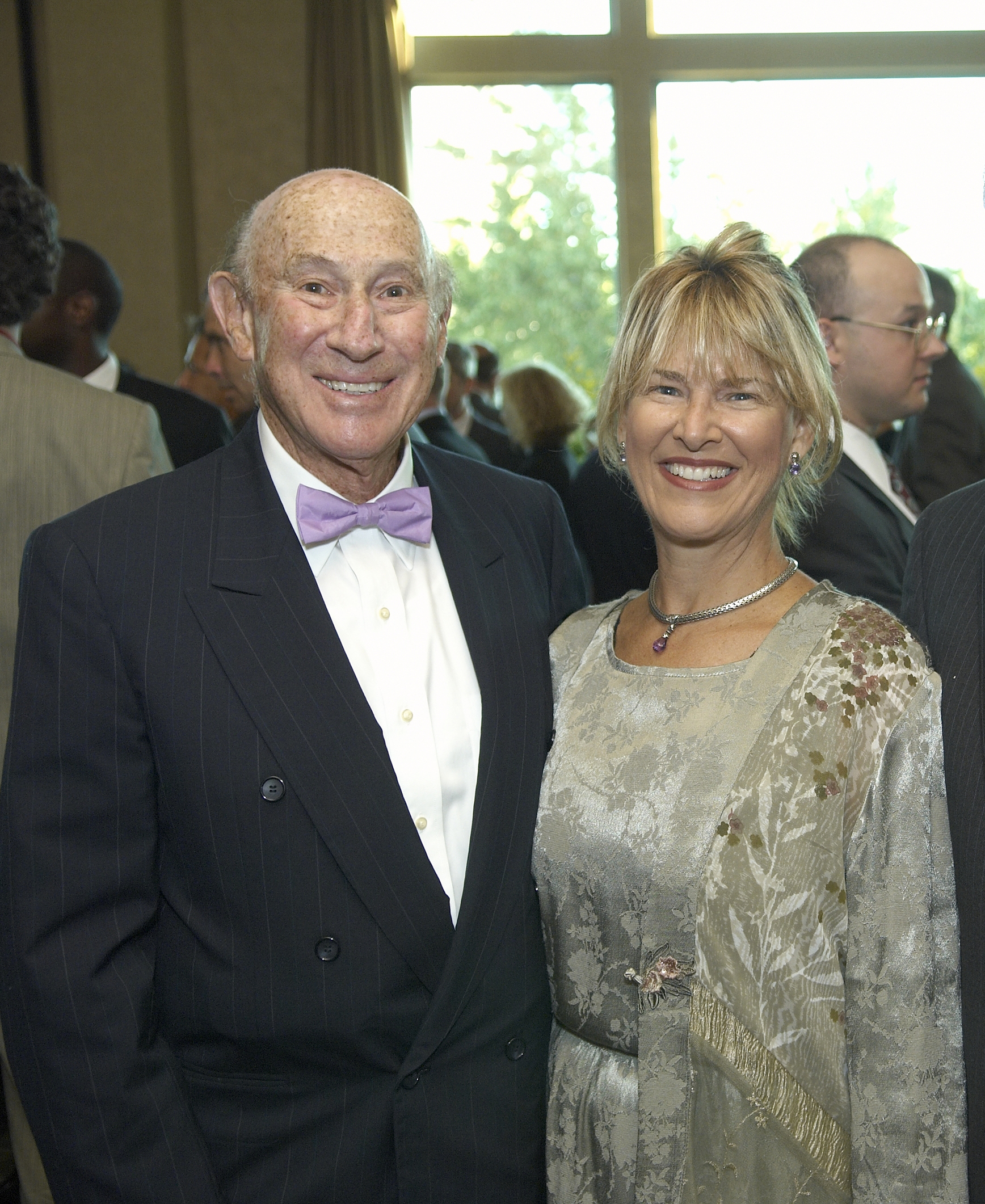
- Pariser with his wife Louise in 2005
- Born: December 8, 1923; Harbin, China
- Died: February 2, 2021 (aged 97)
- Education: University of California, Berkeley (BS); University of Minnesota (PhD)
- Known for: Pariser–Parr–Pople method
- Spouse: Margaret Louise Marsh (m. 1972)
- Scientific career
- Fields: Physical Chemistry
- Workplaces: DuPont

Rudolph Israel Pariser (December 8, 1923 – February 2, 2021) was an American physical and polymer chemist.

== Biography ==
Rudolph Israel Pariser was born in Harbin, China to merchant parents, Ludwig Jacob Pariser and Lia Rubinstein. He attended the Von Hindenburg Schule in Harbin, an American Missionary School in Beijing and American School in Japan in Tokyo. He left for the United States just before World War II broke out.

Pariser received his Bachelor of Science degree from the University of California, Berkeley in 1944, and his Ph. D. degree from the University of Minnesota in physical chemistry in 1950. From 1944 to 1946, during World War II and shortly afterward, he served in the United States Army. He became a naturalized citizen of the United States in 1944.

Pariser spent most of his career as a polymer chemist working for DuPont in the Central Research Department at the Experimental Station. He rose to the level of Director of Polymer Sciences, leading it during a time of great innovation. After retiring from DuPont, he formed his own consulting company.

Pariser is best known for his work with Robert G. Parr on the method of molecular orbital computation now known (because it was independently developed by John A. Pople) as the Pariser–Parr–Pople method (PPP method), published both by Pariser and Parr and by Pople in almost simultaneous papers in 1953.

On July 31, 1972, Pariser married Margaret Louise Marsh. He died on February 2, 2021, at the age of 97.
