= Pariser–Parr–Pople method =

Calculation method in quantum chemistry

In molecular physics, the Pariser–Parr–Pople (PPP) method applies semi-empirical quantum mechanical methods to the quantitative prediction of electronic structures and spectra, in molecules of interest in the field of organic chemistry. Previous methods existed—such as the Hückel method which led to Hückel's rule—but were limited in their scope, application and complexity, as is the extended Hückel method.

This approach was developed in the 1950s by Rudolph Pariser with Robert Parr and co-developed by John Pople. It is essentially a more efficient method of finding reasonable approximations of molecular orbitals, useful in predicting physical and chemical nature of the molecule under study since molecular orbital characteristics have implications with regard to both the basic structure and reactivity of a molecule. This method used the zero-differential overlap (ZDO) approximation to reduce the problem to reasonable size and complexity but still required modern solid state computers (as opposed to punched card or vacuum tube systems) before becoming fully useful for molecules larger than benzene.

Originally, Pariser's goal of using this method was to predict the characteristics of complex organic dyes, but this was never realized. The method has wide applicability in precise prediction of electronic transitions, particularly lower singlet transitions, and found wide application in theoretical and applied quantum chemistry. The two basic papers on this subject were among the top five chemistry and physics citations reported in ISI, Current Contents 1977 for the period of 1961–1977 with a total of 2450 references.

In contrast to the Hartree–Fock-based semiempirical method counterparts (i.e.: MOPAC), the pi-electron theories have a very strong ab initio basis. The PPP formulation is actually an approximate pi-electron effective operator, and the empirical parameters, in fact, include effective electron correlation effects. A rigorous, ab initio theory of the PPP method is provided by diagrammatic, multi-reference, high order perturbation theory (Freed, Brandow, Lindgren, etc.). (The exact formulation is non-trivial, and requires some field theory) Large scale ab initio calculations (Martin and Birge, Martin and Freed, Sheppard and Freed, etc.) have confirmed many of the approximations of the PPP model and explain why the PPP-like models work so well with such a simple formulation.
