= ZINDO =

ZINDO is a semi-empirical quantum chemistry method used in computational chemistry. It is a development of the INDO method. It stands for Zerner's Intermediate Neglect of Differential Overlap, as it was developed by Michael Zerner and his coworkers in the 1970s. Unlike INDO, which was really restricted to organic molecules and those containing the atoms B to F, ZINDO covers a wide range of the periodic table, even including the rare-earth elements. There are two distinct versions of the method:

- ZINDO/1 – for calculating ground-state properties such as bond lengths and bond angles. It refers to a SCF (RHF or ROHF) calculation with the INDO/1 level as suggested by Pople, which provides the reference state MO coefficients. Ground-state dipole moments and ionization potentials are in general very accurate. Geometry optimizations are erratic, what prompted Zerner's group to improve the performance of the code in the late 1990s
- ZINDO/S (sometimes just called INDO/S) – use the INDO/1 molecular orbitals for calculating excited states and hence electronic spectra. It consists of a CI calculation including only the reference state plus a small set of single-electron excitations within a selected active space, typically five HOMOs and five LUMOs.

The original BIGSPEC program from the Zerner group is not widely available, but the method is implemented in ORCA, in part, in Gaussian, and in SCIGRESS.

To obtain good results, it is frequently necessary to fit the parameters to a given molecule, thereby making it ideal only in semi-empirical calculations.
