= INDO =

INDO stands for Intermediate Neglect of Differential Overlap. It is a semi-empirical quantum chemistry method that is a development of the complete neglect of differential overlap (CNDO/2) method introduced by John Pople. Like CNDO/2 it uses zero-differential overlap for the two-electron integrals but not for integrals that are over orbitals centered on the same atom.

The method is now rarely used in its original form with some exceptions but it is the basis for several other methods, such as MINDO, ZINDO and SINDO.

== See also ==
- Computational chemistry
