= Robert Parr =

American theoretical chemist (1921–2017)

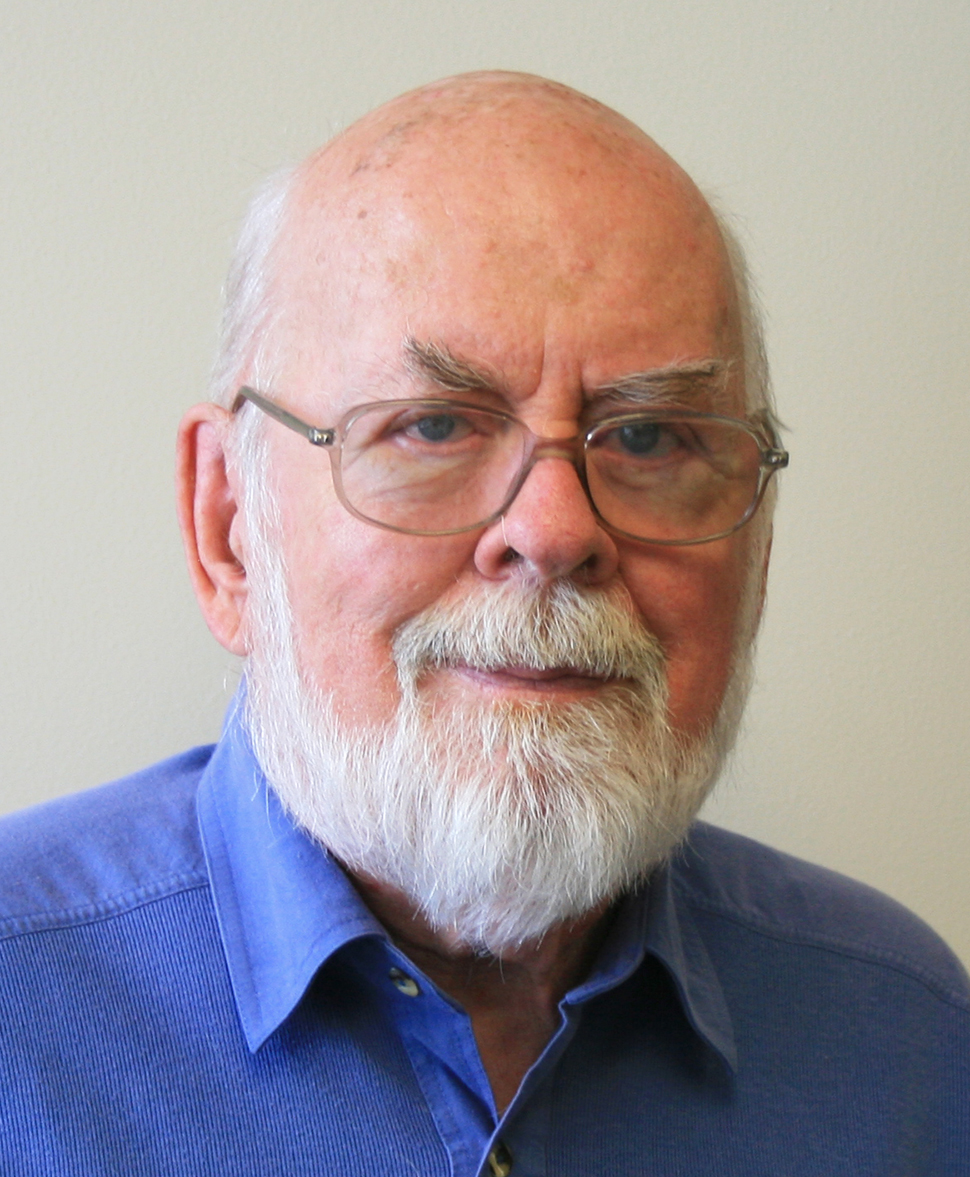
Portrait of Robert Ghormley Parr

Robert Ghormley Parr (September 22, 1921 – March 27, 2017) was an American theoretical chemist who was a professor of chemistry at the University of North Carolina at Chapel Hill.

== Career ==
Parr received an A. B. degree magna cum laude from Brown University in 1942, and then entered the University of Minnesota, receiving a Ph.D. in physical chemistry in 1947. He joined the faculty at Minnesota upon receiving his Ph.D. and remained there one year. In 1948 he moved to the Carnegie Institute of Technology (now Carnegie Mellon University) in Pittsburgh, Pennsylvania, becoming a full professor in 1957. In 1962 he moved to Johns Hopkins University in Baltimore, Maryland, and in 1974 to the University of North Carolina at Chapel Hill, where he received appointment to an endowed professorship in 1990 and where he last taught.

== Achievements and awards ==
Working with DuPont chemist Rudolph Pariser, Parr developed a method of computing approximate molecular orbitals for pi electron systems, published in 1953. Since an identical procedure was derived by John A. Pople the same year, it is generally referred to as the Pariser–Parr–Pople method or PPP method. The PPP method differed from existing structural chemistry thinking (which advocated maximum overlap principle) by advancing the concept of zero differential overlap approximation.

By 1978 Parr had realized that density functional theory (DFT) would be extremely useful in quantitative calculations of chemical and biological systems, especially those with high molecular weights. In 1988 Parr, Weitao Yang and Chengteh Lee produced an improved DFT method which could approximate the correlation energy of systems. The LYP (for Lee–Yang–Parr) functional theory is now one of the most cited papers in the chemical literature.

In 1963 Parr published Quantum Theory of Molecular Electronic Structure, one of the first books to apply quantum theory to chemical systems.

In 1989 he and Yang published Density Functional Theory of Atoms and Molecules, now considered the basic textbook on DFT.

== Awards and honors ==
- Member of the International Academy of Quantum Molecular Science
- 1967 - Co-founded (with 4 others) the International Academy of Quantum Molecular Science
- 1994 - Winner of American Chemical Society's Irving Langmuir Award in Chemical Physics
- 2004 - winner of United States National Academy of Sciences Award in Chemical Sciences
- 2009 - winner of American Chemical Society's Award in Theoretical Chemistry
