= SINDO =

Quantum chemistry method

SINDO is one of many semi-empirical quantum chemistry methods. It stands for symmetric orthogonalised INDO and was developed by K. Jug and coworkers. Like MINDO, it is a development of the INDO method. The main development is the inclusion of d orbitals for atoms of the second row of the periodic table. It performs better for hypervalent compounds than other semiempirical methods.
