= Semi-empirical quantum chemistry method =

Method in quantum chemistry

Semi-empirical quantum chemistry methods are based on the Hartree–Fock formalism, but make many approximations and obtain some parameters from empirical data. They are very important in computational chemistry for treating large molecules where the full Hartree–Fock method without the approximations is too expensive. The use of empirical parameters appears to allow some inclusion of electron correlation effects into the methods.

Within the framework of Hartree–Fock calculations, some pieces of information (such as two-electron integrals) are sometimes approximated or completely omitted. In order to correct for this loss, semi-empirical methods are parametrized, that is their results are fitted by a set of parameters, normally in such a way as to produce results that best agree with experimental data, but sometimes to agree with ab initio results.

== Type of simplifications used ==
Semi-empirical methods follow what are often called empirical methods where the two-electron part of the Hamiltonian is not explicitly included. For π-electron systems, this was the Hückel method proposed by Erich Hückel. For all valence electron systems, the extended Hückel method was proposed by Roald Hoffmann.

Semi-empirical calculations are much faster than their ab initio counterparts, mostly due to the use of the zero differential overlap approximation. Their results, however, can be very wrong if the molecule being computed is not similar enough to the molecules in the database used to parametrize the method.

== Preferred application domains ==
=== Methods restricted to π-electrons ===
These methods exist for the calculation of electronically excited states of polyenes, both cyclic and linear. These methods, such as the Pariser–Parr–Pople method (PPP), can provide good estimates of the π-electronic excited states, when parameterized well. For many years, the PPP method outperformed ab initio excited state calculations.

=== Methods restricted to all valence electrons ===
These methods can be grouped into several groups:

- Methods such as CNDO/2, INDO and NDDO that were introduced by John Pople. The implementations aimed to fit, not experiment, but ab initio minimum basis set results. These methods are now rarely used but the methodology is often the basis of later methods.

- Methods that are in the MOPAC, AMPAC, SPARTAN and/or CP2K computer programs originally from the group of Michael Dewar. These are MINDO, MNDO, AM1, PM3, PM6, PM7 and SAM1. Here the objective is to use parameters to fit experimental heats of formation, dipole moments, ionization potentials, and geometries. This is by far the largest group of semiempirical methods.

- Methods whose primary aim is to calculate excited states and hence predict electronic spectra. These include ZINDO and SINDO. The OMx (x=1,2,3) methods can also be viewed as belonging to this class, although they are also suitable for ground-state applications; in particular, the combination of OM2 and MRCI is an important tool for excited state molecular dynamics.

- Tight-binding methods, e.g. a large family of methods known as DFTB, are sometimes classified as semiempirical methods as well. More recent examples include the semiempirical quantum mechanical methods GFNn-xTB (n = 0,1,2), which are particularly suited for the geometry, vibrational frequencies, and non-covalent interactions of large molecules.

- The NOTCH method includes many new, physically-motivated terms compared to the NDDO family of methods, is much less empirical than the other semi-empirical methods (almost all of its parameters are determined non-empirically), provides robust accuracy for bonds between uncommon element combinations, and is applicable to ground and excited states.

== See also ==
- List of quantum chemistry and solid-state physics software
