= Extended Hückel method =

Semiempirical quantum chemistry method

The extended Hückel method is a semiempirical quantum chemistry method, developed by Roald Hoffmann since 1963. It is based on the Hückel method but, while the original Hückel method only considers pi orbitals, the extended method also includes the sigma orbitals.

== Description ==
The extended Hückel method can be used for determining the molecular orbitals, but it is not very successful in determining the structural geometry of an organic molecule. It can however determine the relative energy of different geometrical configurations. It involves calculations of the electronic interactions in a rather simple way for which the electron-electron repulsions are not explicitly included and the total energy is just a sum of terms for each electron in the molecule. The off-diagonal Hamiltonian matrix elements are given by an approximation due to Max Wolfsberg and Lindsay Helmholz that relates them to the diagonal elements and the overlap matrix element.

$$H_{ij} = KS_{ij} \dfrac{H_{ii} + H_{jj}}{2}$$

K is the Wolfsberg–Helmholz constant, and is usually given a value of 1.75. In the extended Hückel method, only valence electrons are considered; the core electron energies and functions are supposed to be more or less constant between atoms of the same type. The method uses a series of parametrized energies calculated from atomic ionization potentials or theoretical methods to fill the diagonal of the Fock matrix. After filling the non-diagonal elements and diagonalizing the resulting Fock matrix, the energies (eigenvalues) and wavefunctions (eigenvectors) of the valence orbitals are found.

It is common in many theoretical studies to use the extended Hückel molecular orbitals as a preliminary step to determining the molecular orbitals by a more sophisticated method such as the CNDO/2 method and ab initio quantum chemistry methods. Since the extended Hückel basis set is fixed, the monoparticle calculated wavefunctions must be projected to the basis set where the accurate calculation is to be done. One usually does this by adjusting the orbitals in the new basis to the old ones by least squares method. As only valence electron wavefunctions are found by this method, one must fill the core electron functions by orthonormalizing the rest of the basis set with the calculated orbitals and then selecting the ones with less energy. This leads to the determination of more accurate structures and electronic properties, or in the case of ab initio methods, to somewhat faster convergence.

The method was first used by Roald Hoffmann who developed, with Robert Burns Woodward, rules for elucidating reaction mechanisms (the Woodward–Hoffmann rules). He used pictures of the molecular orbitals from extended Hückel theory to work out the orbital interactions in these cycloaddition reactions.

A closely similar method was used earlier by Hoffmann and William Lipscomb for studies of boron hydrides. The off-diagonal Hamiltonian matrix elements were given as proportional to the overlap integral.

$$H_{ij} = K S_{ij}$$

This simplification of the Wolfsberg and Helmholz approximation is reasonable for boron hydrides as the diagonal elements are reasonably similar due to the small difference in electronegativity between boron and hydrogen.

The method works poorly for molecules that contain atoms of very different electronegativity. To overcome this weakness, several groups have suggested iterative schemes that depend on the atomic charge. One such method, that is still widely used in inorganic and organometallic chemistry is the Fenske–Hall method.

== Software ==
A program for the extended Hückel method is YAeHMOP which stands for "yet another extended Hückel molecular orbital package". YAeHMOP has also been merged with the Avogadro open-source molecular editor and visualizer to enable calculations directly from the Avogadro graphical user interface for materials that are periodic in one, two, or three dimensions. This integration also enables visualization of band structures, total and projected density of states, and crystal orbital overlap/Hamilton populations (COOPs/COHPs).

== See also ==
- Erich Hückel
- Roald Hoffmann
