= Pople notation =

The Pople notation is named after the Nobel laureate John Pople and is a simple method of presenting second-order spin coupling systems in NMR.

The notation labels each (NMR active) nucleus with a letter of the alphabet. The difference in chemical shift, δ, relative to the J-coupling between nuclei mirrors the separation of the letter labels in the Latin alphabet. The letters used tend to be limited to A, B, M, N, X, Y.

For example, AB indicates two nuclei which have similar chemical shifts (Δδ similar to or smaller than J), whereas AX indicates two which lie further apart on the spectrum (Δδ significantly larger than J). A_{2}B would similarly indicate a spin system containing two equivalent nuclei (A) and a third, inequivalent one (B). Nuclei which are in equivalent chemical environments (that is, symmetry-related), but inequivalent magnetic environments are distinguished with a prime; e.g. AA'. This key aspect of the notation, i.e., using a prime to differentiate between chemical equivalence only compared to full magnetic equivalence, was introduced by Richards and Schaefer in 1958.

The notation can be used to represent systems of more than two nuclei, for example AMX represents three nuclei, each moderately separated from the others, and ABX represents two nuclei whose peaks are closely spaced and one other nucleus which is more distant.

Examples: PHCl_{2} is an AX system whereas CH_{3}CH_{2}F is an A_{3}M_{2}X system,
