= Quadratic configuration interaction =

Quadratic configuration interaction (QCI) is an extension of configuration interaction that corrects for size-consistency errors in single and double excitation CI methods (CISD).

Size-consistency means that the energy of two non-interacting (i.e. at large distance apart) molecules calculated directly will be the sum of the energies of the two molecules calculated separately. This method called QCISD was developed in the group of John Pople. It gives results that are comparable to the coupled cluster method, CCSD. QCISD can be improved by the same perturbative inclusion of unlinked triples to give QCISD(T). This gives similar results to CCSD(T).
