= Journal of Computational Biophysics and Chemistry =

- Discipline: Chemistry
- Language: English
- Edited by: Emil Alexov

Publication details
- Former names: Journal of Theoretical and Computational Chemistry
- History: 2002–present
- Publisher: World Scientific
- Frequency: 8/year
- Open access: Hybrid
- Impact factor: 2.440 (2021)

Standard abbreviations
- ISO 4: J. Comput. Biophys. Chem.

Indexing
- CODEN: JCBCBP
- ISSN: 2737-4165 (print); 2737-4173 (web)
- LCCN: 2003203030
- OCLC no.: 1233124948
- Journal of Theoretical and Computational Chemistry
- ISSN: 0219-6336 (print); 1793-6888 (web)

Links
- Journal homepage; Online access

The Journal of Computational Biophysics and Chemistry is a peer-reviewed scientific journal covering developments in theoretical and computational chemistry and biophysics, as well as their applications to other scientific fields, such as medicine, pharmaceutical and materials sciences. It was established in 2002 as the Journal of Theoretical and Computational Chemistry, obtaining its current title in 2021. It is published by World Scientific and the editor-in-chief is Emil Alexov (Clemson University).

== Abstracting and indexing ==
The journal is abstracted and indexed in:

- Chemical Abstracts Service
- Current Contents/Physical, Chemical & Earth Sciences
- EBSCO databases
- Inspec
- ProQuest databases
- Science Citation Index Expanded
- Scopus

According to the Journal Citation Reports, the journal has a 2021 impact factor of 2.440.
