= CNDO/2 =

One of the first semi empirical methods in quantum chemistry

Complete Neglect of Differential Overlap (CNDO) is one of the first semi empirical methods in quantum chemistry. It uses the frozen core approximation, in which only the outer valence electrons are explicitly included, and the approximation of zero-differential overlap.

CNDO/2 is the main version of CNDO. The method was first introduced by John Pople and collaborators.

== Background ==
An earlier method was Extended Hückel method, which explicitly ignores electron-electron repulsion terms. It was a method for calculating the electronic energy and the molecular orbitals. CNDO/1 and CNDO/2 were developed from this method by explicitly including the electron-electron repulsion terms, but neglecting many of them, approximating some of them and fitting others to experimental data from spectroscopy.

== Methodology ==
Quantum mechanics provides equations based on the Hartree–Fock method and the Roothaan equations that CNDO uses to model atoms and their locations. These equations are solved iteratively to the point where the results do not vary significantly between two iterations. CNDO does not involve knowledge about chemical bonds but instead uses knowledge about quantum wavefunctions.

CNDO can be used for both closed shell molecules, where the electrons are fully paired in molecular orbitals and open shell molecules, which are radicals with unpaired electrons. It is also used in solid state and nanostructures calculations.

CNDO is considered to yield good results for partial atomic charges and molecular dipole moment. Total energy and binding energy are calculated. Eigenvalues for calculating the highest occupied molecular orbital and lowest unoccupied molecular orbital are reported from the closed shell approach.

== See also ==
- Molecular geometry
- INDO
- NDDO
