= John Pople =

British theoretical chemist (1925–2004)

Sir John Pople KBE FRS
- Born: John Anthony Pople; 31 October 1925; Burnham-on-Sea, Somerset, England
- Died: 15 March 2004 (aged 78); Chicago, Illinois, U.S.
- Education: University of Cambridge
- Known for: Pariser–Parr–Pople method
- Spouse: Joy Bowers (m. 1952; died 2002)
- Awards: Mayhew Prize (1948); FRS (1961); Irving Langmuir Award (1970); Davy Medal (1988); Wolf Prize in Chemistry (1992); Nobel Prize in Chemistry (1998); Copley Medal (2002)
- Scientific career
- Fields: Theoretical chemistry; Quantum chemistry; Computational chemistry
- Workplaces: Bristol Aeroplane Company; University of Cambridge; Carnegie Mellon University; Northwestern University; National Physical Laboratory
- Thesis: Lone Pair Electrons (1951)
- Doctoral advisor: John Lennard-Jones
- Doctoral students: A. David Buckingham; Martin Head-Gordon; Mark S. Gordon; Krishnan Raghavachari
- Website: nobelprize.org/nobel_prizes/chemistry/laureates/1998/pople-bio.html

Sir John Anthony Pople (31 October 1925 – 15 March 2004) was a British theoretical chemist who was awarded the Nobel Prize in Chemistry with Walter Kohn in 1998 for his development of computational methods in quantum chemistry.

== Early life and education ==
Pople was born in Burnham-on-Sea, Somerset, and attended the Bristol Grammar School. He won a scholarship to Trinity College, Cambridge, in 1943. He received his Bachelor of Arts degree in 1946. Between 1945 and 1947 he worked at the Bristol Aeroplane Company. He then returned to the University of Cambridge and was awarded his PhD in mathematics in 1951 on lone pair electrons.

== Career ==
After obtaining his PhD, he was a research fellow at Trinity College, Cambridge and then from 1954 a lecturer in the mathematics faculty at Cambridge. In 1958, he moved to the National Physical Laboratory, near London as head of the new basics physics division. He moved to the United States of America in 1964, where he lived the rest of his life, though he retained British citizenship. Pople considered himself more of a mathematician than a chemist, but theoretical chemists consider him one of the most important of their number. In 1964 he moved to Carnegie Mellon University in Pittsburgh, Pennsylvania, where he had experienced a sabbatical in 1961 to 1962. In 1993 he moved to Northwestern University in Evanston, Illinois, where he was Trustees Professor of Chemistry until his death.

== Research ==
Pople's major scientific contributions were in four different areas:

=== Statistical mechanics of water ===
Pople's early paper on the statistical mechanics of water, according to Michael J. Frisch, "remained the standard for many years". This was his thesis topic for his PhD at Cambridge supervised by John Lennard-Jones.

=== Nuclear magnetic resonance ===
In the early days of nuclear magnetic resonance he studied the underlying theory, and in 1959 he co-authored the textbook High Resolution Nuclear Magnetic Resonance with W.G. Schneider and H.J. Bernstein.

=== Semi-empirical theory ===
He made major contributions to the theory of approximate molecular orbital (MO) calculations, starting with one identical to the one developed by Rudolph Pariser and Robert G. Parr on pi electron systems, and now called the Pariser–Parr–Pople method. Subsequently, he developed the methods of Complete Neglect of Differential Overlap (CNDO) (in 1965) and Intermediate Neglect of Differential Overlap (INDO) for approximate MO calculations on three-dimensional molecules, and other developments in computational chemistry. In 1970 he and David Beveridge coauthored the book Approximate Molecular Orbital Theory describing these methods.

=== Ab initio electronic structure theory ===
Pople pioneered the development of more sophisticated computational methods, called ab initio quantum chemistry methods, that use basis sets of either Slater type orbitals or Gaussian orbitals to model the wave function. While in the early days these calculations were extremely expensive to perform, the advent of high speed microprocessors has made them much more feasible today. He was instrumental in the development of one of the most widely used computational chemistry packages, the Gaussian suite of programs, including coauthorship of the first version, Gaussian 70. One of his most important original contributions is the concept of a model chemistry whereby a method is rigorously evaluated across a range of molecules. His research group developed the quantum chemistry composite methods such as Gaussian-1 (G1) and Gaussian-2 (G2). In 1991, Pople stopped working on Gaussian and several years later he developed (with others) the Q-Chem computational chemistry program. Prof. Pople's departure from Gaussian, along with the subsequent banning of many prominent scientists, including himself, from using the software gave rise to considerable controversy among the quantum chemistry community.

The Gaussian molecular orbital methods were described in the 1986 book Ab initio molecular orbital theory by Warren Hehre, Leo Radom, Paul v.R. Schleyer and Pople.

== Awards and honours ==
Pople received the Wolf Prize in Chemistry in 1992, and the Nobel Prize in Chemistry in 1998. He was elected a Fellow of the Royal Society (FRS) in 1961. He was made a Knight Commander (KBE) of the Order of the British Empire in 2003. He was a founding member of the International Academy of Quantum Molecular Science.

An IT room and a scholarship are named after him at Bristol Grammar School, as is a supercomputer at the Pittsburgh Supercomputing Center.

== Personal life ==
Pople married Joy Bowers in 1952 and was married until her death from cancer in 2002. Pople died of liver cancer in Chicago in 2004. He was survived by his daughter Hilary, and sons Adrian, Mark and Andrew. In accordance with his wishes, Pople's Nobel Medal was given to Carnegie Mellon University by his family on 5 October 2009. He was a Christian.

== See also ==
- Pople diagram
- Pople notation
- STO-nG basis sets
- Unrestricted Hartree–Fock
- NDDO
