= List of materials science software =

Software used for simulations and modeling in materials science

This is a list of materials science software, including programs used for modeling, simulation, and analysis of materials at electronic, atomistic, mesoscopic, and continuum scales.

== Density functional theory (DFT) and electronic-structure codes ==
Software	Description	License
ABINIT	Plane-wave DFT and pseudopotential code	Open-source
CASTEP	Plane-wave DFT code for materials modeling	Commercial
CP2K	Atomistic and electronic structure simulations	Open-source
CRYSTAL	Gaussian-type orbital DFT for periodic systems	Commercial
DMol3	Density functional theory / quantum chemistry for molecules and materials	Commercial
FHI-aims	All-electron DFT code using numeric atom-centered orbitals	Open-source
Gaussian	Quantum chemistry DFT and ab initio calculations	Commercial
NWChem	Scalable computational chemistry package including DFT	Open-source
Octopus	Real-space TDDFT and electronic structure simulations	Open-source
OpenMX	DFT code using pseudopotentials and localized orbitals	Open-source
Quantum ESPRESSO	Plane-wave DFT and materials modeling suite	Open-source
SIESTA	DFT with numerical atomic orbitals for large systems	Open-source
VASP	Plane-wave DFT code for periodic systems	Commercial
WIEN2k	All-electron DFT using augmented plane waves	Commercial
VASP	Density functional theory / ab initio quantum chemistry	Commercial

== Molecular dynamics (MD) ==
Software	Description	License
LAMMPS	Classical molecular dynamics for materials modeling	Open-source
GROMACS	High-performance molecular dynamics	Open-source

== Kinetic Monte Carlo / mesoscopic modeling ==
Software	Description	License
CASINO	Quantum Monte Carlo simulations of electronic structure	Commercial
KMCLib	Kinetic Monte Carlo simulations for lattice models	Open-source
OpenKIM	Repository and runtime for interatomic potentials	Open-source

== Phase-field and microstructure evolution ==
Software	Description	License
FiPy	Python-based finite volume solver for phase-field modeling	Open-source
MOOSE	Multiphysics framework including phase-field modules	Open-source
OpenPhase	Phase-field microstructure evolution simulation	Open-source
MICRESS	Phase-field simulation for metallurgical microstructures	Commercial

== Finite-element / continuum materials simulation ==
Software	Description	License
ABAQUS	Commercial FEM solver for structural and continuum mechanics	Commercial
ANSYS	Commercial finite-element and multiphysics simulation suite	Commercial
COMSOL Multiphysics	Multiphysics FEM solver including structural, thermal, and fluid simulations	Commercial
Elmer FEM	Open-source multiphysics finite-element solver	Open-source
OpenFOAM	Open-source computational fluid dynamics and continuum mechanics solver	Open-source

== Crystallography, diffraction, and materials analysis ==
Software	Description	License
Crystalmaker	Crystallography and molecular modeling visualization	Commercial
FullProf	Rietveld analysis of X-ray and neutron powder diffraction data	Commercial
General Structure Analysis System (GSAS)	Crystallographic structure refinement and analysis	Commercial
Jmol	Open-source molecular and crystal structure visualization	Open-source
Materials Studio	Commercial molecular and materials modeling suite	Commercial
VESTA	Visualization of crystal, volumetric, and morphology data	Commercial

== See also ==
- Crystallography Open Database
- Computational materials science
- Modelling and Simulation in Materials Science and Engineering
- Multiscale modeling
- List of computational physics software
- List of computational chemistry software
- List of emerging materials science technologies
- List of materials science journals
