= Amsterdam Density Functional =

ADF Info
- Developers: Software for Chemistry & Materials
- Stable release: ams2026.102 / 2026; 0 years ago
- Operating system: Unix-like: Linux, macOS; Windows
- Type: Computational chemistry
- Website: www.scm.com

Amsterdam Density Functional (ADF) is a program for first-principles electronic structure calculations using density functional theory (DFT). ADF was first developed in the early seventies by the group of E. J. Baerends from the Vrije Universiteit Amsterdam, and by the group of T. Ziegler from the University of Calgary. Now, many other academic groups are contributing to the software. Software for Chemistry & Materials (SCM), formerly named Scientific Computing & Modelling is a research spin-off company from the Baerends group. SCM has been coordinating the development and distribution of ADF since 1995. Together with the rise in popularity of DFT in the 1990s, ADF has become a popular computational chemistry software package used in the industrial and academic research. ADF excels in spectroscopy, transition metals, and heavy metals domains. A periodic structure counterpart of ADF named BAND is available to study bulk crystals, polymers, and surfaces. The Amsterdam Modeling Suite has expanded beyond DFT since 2010, with the semi-empirical MOPAC code, the Quantum ESPRESSO plane wave code, a density-functional based tight binding (DFTB) module, a reactive force field module ReaxFF, and an implementation of Klamt's COSMO-RS method, which also includes COSMO-SAC, UNIFAC, and QSPR.

== Specific features and abilities ==
See ADF website for a comprehensive list.

- Slater-type orbitals (STOs) as basis functions for both molecular and periodic calculations, in contrast to Gaussian orbitals (GTOs) and plane waves in other codes.
- Basis sets and relativistic methods (zeroth order regular approximation to the Dirac equation (ZORA), X2C: scalar relativistic and spin-orbit coupling) for all the chemical elements up to no. 118.
- Various molecular properties: infrared spectroscopy (IR), Raman, vibrational circular dichroism (VCD), ultraviolet-visible spectroscopy (UV), X-ray absorption spectroscopy (XAS) spectra; nuclear magnetic resonance (NMR) and electron paramagnetic resonance (EPR (ESR)) parameters.
- Solvent and environmental effects via COSMO, quantum mechanics/molecular mechanics (QM/MM), DRF, subsystem DFT.
- Many chemical analysis tools (energy decomposition analysis, transfer integrals, (partial) density of states, etc.)
- Periodic DFT with atomic orbitals: 1D, 2D, 3D and a graphical interface to plane wave code Quantum ESPRESSO
- Thermodynamic properties of solvents and solutions (solubility, partition coefficient (LogP), vapor–liquid equilibrium (VLE), LLE) with COSMO-RS
- Semi-empirical modules MOPAC and DFTB
- Parallelized ReaxFF with GUI for reactive molecular dynamics
- Integrated graphical user interface (GUI) for all modules to set up calculations and visualize the results.
- Out-of-the-box parallel calculations via IntelMPI, OpenMPI or native MPI; limited GPU support

== See also ==
- Quantum chemistry computer programs
