= Qbox =

Open source software

- Original author: Francois Gygi
- Developers: University of California, Davis; Ivan Duchemin, Jun Wu, Quan Wan, William Dawson, Martin Schlipf, He Ma, Michael LaCount
- Release: 2003; 23 years ago
- Stable release: 1.78.4 / 24 April 2025; 18 months ago
- Written in: C++
- Operating system: Unix, Unix-like, FreeBSD
- Platform: x86-64
- Available in: English
- Type: molecular modelling
- License: GPL
- Website: qboxcode.org
- Repository: github.com/qboxcode

Qbox is a software package for atomic-scale simulations of molecules, liquids, and solids. It implements first principles (or ab initio) molecular dynamics, a simulation method in which inter-atomic forces are derived from quantum mechanics. A FreeBSD port exists. It is free and open-source software released under a GNU General Public License (GPL). Documentation is at qboxcode.org.

== Main features ==
- Born-Oppenheimer molecular dynamics in the microcanonical (NVE) or canonical ensemble (NVT)
- Car-Parrinello molecular dynamics
- Constrained molecular dynamics for thermodynamic integration
- Efficient computation of maximally localized Wannier functions
- GGA and hybrid density functional approximations (LDA, PBE, SCAN, PBE0, B3LYP, HSE06, ...)
- Electronic structure in the presence of a constant electric field
- Computation of the electronic polarizability
- Electronic response to arbitrary external potentials
- Infrared and Raman spectroscopy

== Methods and approximations ==
Qbox computes molecular dynamics trajectories of atoms using Isaac Newton's equations of motion, with forces derived from electronic structure calculations performed using density functional theory. Simulations can be performed either within the Born–Oppenheimer approximation or using Car-Parrinello molecular dynamics. The electronic ground state is computed at each time step by solving the Kohn-Sham equations. Various levels of density functional theory approximations can be used, including the local-density approximation (LDA), the generalized gradient approximation (GGA), or hybrid functionals that incorporate a fraction of Hartree-Fock exchange energy. Electronic wave functions are expanded using the plane wave basis set. The electron-ion interaction is represented by pseudopotentials.

== Examples of use ==
- Electronic properties of nanoparticles, or aqueous solutions
- Free energy landscape of molecules
- Infrared and Raman spectra of hydrogen at high pressure
- Properties of solid-liquid interfaces

== Code architecture and implementation ==
Qbox is written in C++ and implements parallelism using both the message passing interface (MPI) and the OpenMP application programming interface. It makes use of the BLAS, LAPACK, ScaLAPACK, FFTW and Apache Xerces libraries. Qbox was designed for operation on massively parallel supercomputers such as the IBM Blue Gene, or Cray XC40. In 2006, it was used to establish a performance record on the BlueGene/L computer installed at Lawrence Livermore National Laboratory.

== Interface with other simulation software ==
The function of Qbox can be enhanced by coupling it with other simulation software using a client–server model paradigm. Examples of Qbox coupled operation include:

- Free energy computations: Coupled with the Software Suite for Advanced Ensemble Simulations (SSAGES).
- Quasiparticle energy computations: Coupled with the WEST many-body perturbation software package.
- Path integral quantum simulations: Coupled with the i-PI universal force engine.

== See also ==
- List of quantum chemistry and solid-state physics software
- Density functional theory
