= FHI-aims =

Materials simulation software

- Developer: FHI-aims developers group
- Stable release: 250822 / 22 August 2025; 5 months ago
- Written in: Fortran, MPI
- Operating system: Linux
- Type: Density Functional Theory (simulation), Computational chemistry
- License: Academic / Commercial
- Website: fhi-aims.org

FHI-aims (Fritz Haber Institute ab initio materials simulations) is a software package for computational molecular and materials science written in Fortran. It uses density functional theory and many-body perturbation theory to simulate chemical and physical properties of atoms, molecules, nanostructures, solids, and surfaces. Originally developed at the Fritz Haber Institute in Berlin, the ongoing development of the FHI-aims source code is now driven by a worldwide community of collaborating research institutions.

== Overview ==
The FHI-aims software package is an all-electron, full-potential electronic structure code utilizing numeric atom-centered basis functions for its electronic structure calculations. The localized basis set enables the accurate treatment of all electrons on the same footing in periodic and non-periodic systems without relying on the approximation for the core states, such as pseudopotentials. Importantly, the basis sets enable high numerical accuracy on par with the best available all-electron reference methods while remaining scalable to system sizes up to several thousands of atoms. In order to achieve this for bulk solids, surfaces or other low-dimensional systems and molecules, the choice of basis functions is crucial. The workload of the simulations is efficiently distributable for parallel computing using the MPI communication protocol. The code is routinely used on platforms ranging from laptops to distributed-parallel supercomputers with ten thousand CPUs, and the scalability of the code has been tested up to 100,000's of CPUs.

The primary production methods of FHI-aims are density functional theory as well as many-body methods and higher-level quantum chemistry approaches. For the exchange-correlation treatment, local (LDA), semi-local (e.g., PBE, PBEsol), meta-GGA, and hybrid (e.g., HSE06, B3LYP) functionals have been implemented. The resulting orbitals can be used within the framework of many-body perturbation theory, such as Møller-Plesset perturbation theory or the GW approximation. Moreover, thermodynamic properties of the molecules and solids are accessible via Born-Oppenheimer molecular dynamics and path integral molecular dynamics methods. The first step is to expand the Kohn-Sham orbitals packages $\psi_i(r)$ into a set of basis functions $\{\phi_j(r)\}$
$$\psi_i(r) = \sum_j C_{ij} \phi_j(r).$$
Since FHI-aims is an all-electron full-potential code that is computationally efficient without compromising accuracy, the choice of basis function is crucial in order to achieve the said accuracy. Therefore, FHI-aims is based on numerically tabulated atom-centered orbitals (NAOs) of the form:
$$\phi_j(r) = \frac{\mu_j(r)}{r} Y_{lm}(\Omega).$$
As the name implies, the radial shape $\mu_j(r)$ is numerically tabulated and, therefore, fully flexible. This allows the creation of optimized element-dependent basis sets that are as compact as possible while retaining a high and transferable accuracy in production calculations up to meV-level total energy convergence. To obtain real-valued $\phi_j(r)$, $Y_{lm}(\Omega)$ here denotes the real parts ($m=0,\ldots,l$) and imaginary parts ($m=-l,\ldots,-1$) of complex spherical harmonics, with $l$ an implicit function of the radial function index $j$.

== History ==
The first line of code of the actual FHI-aims code was written in late 2004, using the atomic solver employed in the Fritz Haber Institute pseudopotential program package fhi98PP as a foundation to obtain radial functions for use as basis functions. The first developments benefitted heavily from the excellent set of numerical technologies described in several publications by Bernard Delley and coworkers in the context of the DMol3 code, as well as from many broader methodological developments published in the electronic structure theory community over the years. Initial efforts in FHI-aims focused on developing a complete numeric atom-centered basis set library for density-functional theory from "light" to highly accurate (few meV/atom) accuracy for total energies, available for the elements up to nobelium (Z=102) across the periodic table.

By 2006, work on parallel functionality, support for periodic boundary conditions, total energy gradients (forces) and on exact exchange and many-body perturbation theory had commenced. On May 18, 2009, an initial formal point release of the code, "051809", was made available and laid the foundation for broadening the user and developer base of the code.

== See also ==
- List of quantum chemistry and solid-state physics software
