= FreeON =

Open-source quantum chemistry software

- Stable release: 1.0.8 / November 8, 2013; 12 years ago
- Written in: Fortran, C
- Operating system: Linux, FreeBSD, Unix and like operating systems
- Type: Computational Chemistry
- License: GNU GPLv3
- Website: www.nongnu.org/freeon/Vision.html; github.com/FreeON/freeon

In computer software, FreeON is an experimental, open source (GPL) suite of programs for linear scaling quantum chemistry, formerly known as MondoSCF. It is highly modular, and has been written from scratch for N-scaling SCF theory in Fortran95 and C. Platform independent IO is supported with HDF5. FreeON should compile with most modern Linux distributions. FreeON performs Hartree–Fock, pure density functional, and hybrid HF/DFT calculations (e.g. B3LYP) in a Cartesian-Gaussian LCAO basis. All algorithms are O(N) or O(N lg N) for non-metallic systems. Periodic boundary conditions in 1, 2 and 3 dimensions have been implemented through the Lorentz field ($\Gamma$-point), and an internal coordinate geometry optimizer allows full (atom+cell) relaxation using analytic derivatives. Effective core potentials for energies and forces have been implemented, but Effective Core Potential (ECP) lattice forces do not work yet. Advanced features include O(N) static and dynamic response, as well as time reversible Born Oppenheimer Molecular Dynamics (MD).

== Developers ==
Developer	Affiliation
Matt Challacombe	Los Alamos National Laboratory
Eric Schwegler	Lawrence Livermore National Laboratory
Jessica Tymczak	Houston Community College
Anders M. Niklasson	Los Alamos National Laboratory
Anders Odell	KTH Stockholm
Nicolas Bock	Los Alamos National Laboratory
Karoly Nemeth	Argonne National Laboratory
Valery Weber	University of Zurich
C. K. Gan	Institute for High Performance Computing
Graeme Henkelman	University of Texas at Austin
Robert Snavely	University of Santa Cruz

== See also ==
- List of quantum chemistry and solid state physics software
