= WIEN2k =

- Original authors: P. Blaha, K. Schwarz, G. K. H. Madsen, D. Kvasnicka, J. Luitz, R. Laskowski, F. Tran and L. D. Marks
- Developers: Institute of Materials Chemistry, TU Wien
- Initial release: 1990; 36 years ago
- Stable release: WIEN2k_24.1 / August 5, 2024; 18 months ago
- Written in: Fortran 90
- Operating system: Linux/Unix
- Available in: English
- Type: Density functional theory
- License: Proprietary (industry: 4000 €; academic: 400 €)
- Website: susi.theochem.tuwien.ac.at

The WIEN2k package is a computer program written in Fortran that performs quantum mechanical calculations on periodic solids. It uses the full-potential (linearized) augmented plane-wave and local-orbitals [FP-(L)APW+lo] basis set to solve the Kohn–Sham equations of density functional theory.

WIEN2k was originally developed by Peter Blaha and Karlheinz Schwarz from the Institute of Materials Chemistry of the Vienna University of Technology. The first public release of the code was done in 1990. Then, the next releases were WIEN93, WIEN97, and WIEN2k. The latest version WIEN2k_24.1 was released in August 2024. It has been licensed by more than 3400 user groups and has about 16000 citations on Google scholar (Blaha WIEN2k).

WIEN2k uses density functional theory to calculate the electronic structure of a solid. It is based on the most accurate scheme for the calculation of the bond structure-the full potential energy (linear) augmented plane wave ((L) APW) + local orbit (lo) method. WIEN2k uses an all-electronic solution, including relativistic terms.

== Features and calculated properties ==
WIEN2k works with both centrosymmetric and non-centrosymmetric lattices, with 230 built-in space groups. It supports a variety of functionals including local-density approximation (LDA), many different generalized gradient approximations (GGA), Hubbard models, on-site hybrids, meta-GGA and full hybrids, and can also include spin-orbit coupling and Van der Waals terms. It can be used for structure optimization, both unit cell dimensions and internal atomic positions. For the latter an adaptive fixed-point iteration is used which simultaneously solves for atomic positions and the electron density. The code supports both OpenMP and MPI parallelization, which can be used efficiently in combination. It also supports parallelization by dispatching parts of the calculations to different computers.

A number of different properties can be calculated using the densities, many of these in packages which have been contributed by users over the years. WIEN2K can be used to calculate:

- Density of states
- Electron and spin density
- Bader charges and critical points
- Wannier functions
- Total energies and energy differences
- Fermi surfaces
- Optical properties
- X-ray structure factors
- Atomic forces, from which phonon and elastic properties can be extracted
- Electric field gradients
- Nuclear magnetic resonance spectra
- X-ray emission and X-ray absorption spectra
- Electron energy loss spectra
- Berry phase and related topological properties.

== See also ==
- List of quantum chemistry and solid state physics software
