= Dirac (software) =

Ab initio quantum chemistry program

DIRAC
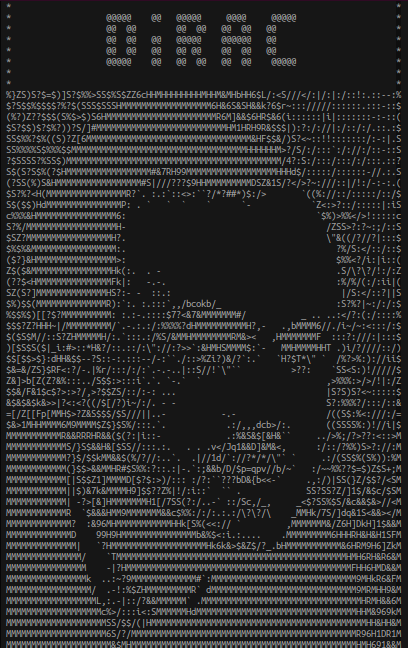
- Developer(s): T. Saue, L. Visscher, H. J. Aa. Jensen, R. Bast, A. S. P. Gomes
- Stable release: DIRAC25
- Operating system: Linux, FreeBSD, Microsoft Windows, macOS
- Type: Computational chemistry
- License: LGPL 2.1 only
- Website: www.diracprogram.org/doku.php/

Dirac (named after Paul Dirac; own notation DIRAC) is a relativistic ab initio quantum chemistry program. The full name is Program for Atomic and Molecular Direct Iterative Relativistic All-electron Calculations, in short PAM DIRAC. It is capable of calculating various molecular properties using the Hartree–Fock, MP2, density functional theory, configuration interaction and coupled cluster electronic structure theories. Dirac is one of the most successful general-purpose quantum chemistry packages that provides accurate description of relativistic effects in molecules, using the Dirac equation as its starting point. The program is available in source code form, see DIRAC Homepage for download information.

The most recent version, DIRAC25, was released on March 25, 2025.

== See also ==
- Quantum chemistry software
