= Materials Studio =

Software for simulating and modeling materials

- Developer(s): Accelrys, now BIOVIA
- Initial release: 2000; 25 years ago
- Stable release: 5.5.2 / 2017; 8 years ago
- Operating system: Windows 7, 8
- Platform: IA-32, x86-64
- Available in: English
- Type: Materials science, chemistry
- License: Proprietary commercial
- Website: www.3ds.com/products-services/biovia/products/molecular-modeling-simulation/biovia-materials-studio/
- As of: 7 August 2016

Materials Studio is software for simulating and modeling materials. It is developed and distributed by BIOVIA (formerly Accelrys), a firm specializing in research software for computational chemistry, bioinformatics, cheminformatics, molecular dynamics simulation, and quantum mechanics.

This software is used in advanced research of various materials, such as polymers, carbon nanotubes, catalysts, metals, ceramics, and so on, by universities (e.g., North Dakota State University), research centers, and high tech companies.

Materials Studio is a client–server model software package with Microsoft Windows-based PC clients and Windows and Linux-based servers running on PCs, Linux IA-64 workstations (including Silicon Graphics (SGI) Altix) and HP XC clusters.

== Software components ==
- Analytical and Crystallization: to investigate, predict, and modify crystal structure and crystal growth.
  - Morphology
  - Polymorph Predictor
  - Reflex, Reflex Plus, Reflex QPA: to assist the interpretation of diffraction data for determination of crystallic structure, to validate the results of experiment and computation.
  - X-Cell: indexing for medium- to high-quality powder diffraction data from X-ray, neutron, and electron radiation sources.
- Quantum and Catalysis
  - Adsorption Locator: to find the most stable adsorption sites for various materials, including zeolites, carbon nanotubes, silica gel, and activated carbon
  - CASTEP: to predict electronic, optical, and structural properties
  - ONETEP: to perform linear-scaling density functional theory simulations
  - DMol3: quantum mechanical methods to predict materials properties
  - Sorption: to predict fundamental properties, such as sorption isotherms (or loading curves) and Henry's constants
  - VAMP: high-speed calculation of a variety of physical and chemical molecular properties, e.g., for quick screening during drug discovery
  - QSAR, QSAR Plus: to identify compounds with optimal physicochemical properties.
- Polymers and Classical Simulation: to construct and characterize models of isolated chains or bulk polymers and predict their properties
- Materials Component Collection
- Materials Visualizer

== Basic workflow ==
- Materials Visualizer is used to construct/import graphical models of materials
- Accurate structure is determined by quantum mechanical, semi-empirical, or classical simulation
- Various required properties may be predicted/analyzed

== See also ==
- Quantum chemistry computer programs
- Comparison of software for molecular mechanics modeling
- Molecular design software
- List of software for Monte Carlo molecular modeling
- List of software for nanostructures modeling
