= List of quantum chemistry and solid-state physics software =

Quantum chemistry computer programs are used in computational chemistry to implement the methods of quantum chemistry. Most include the Hartree–Fock (HF) and some post-Hartree–Fock methods. They may also include density functional theory (DFT), molecular mechanics or semi-empirical quantum chemistry methods. The programs include both open source and commercial software. Most of them are large, often containing several separate programs, and have been developed over many years.

== Overview ==
The following tables illustrates some of the main capabilities of notable packages:

=== Numerical details ===
Package	License^{†}	Language	MPI	OpenMP	GPU	I/O libraries	Parallel I/O
ABINIT	Free, GPL	Fortran	Yes	Yes	Yes, CUDA	Yes, HDF5, NetCDF	Yes, Fortran and HDF5
ACES	Free, GPL	Fortran, C++	Yes	No	Yes	Unknown	Unknown
ADF, Amsterdam Modeling Suite	Commercial	Fortran	Unknown	Unknown	Yes, CUDA	Yes, HDF5, custom	Unknown
AMPAC	Academic	Unknown	Unknown	Unknown	No	Unknown	Unknown
Atomistix ToolKit (QuantumATK)	Commercial	C++, Python	Yes	Yes	Yes, CUDA	Yes, HDF5, NetCDF	Yes, HDF5
BigDFT	Free, GPL	Fortran	Yes	Yes	Yes	Yes, HDF5, NetCDF	Yes, HDF5, NetCDF
CADPAC	Academic	Fortran	Unknown	Unknown	No	Unknown	Unknown
CASINO (QMC)	Academic	Fortran 2003	Yes	Yes	Yes, OpenACC	No	No
CASTEP	Academic, commercial	Fortran 95, Fortran 2003	Yes	Yes	Yes, OpenACC	Unknown	Unknown
COLUMBUS	Free, LGPL	Fortran	Yes	No	No	No	No
CONQUEST	Free, MIT	Fortran 90	Yes	Yes	No	Unknown	Unknown
CP2K	Free, GPL	Fortran 95	Yes	Yes	Yes, CUDA and OpenCL	Unknown	Unknown
CPMD	Academic	Fortran	Yes	Yes	No	Unknown	Unknown
CRYSTAL	Academic (UK), Commercial (IT)	Fortran	Yes	Yes	No	Unknown	Unknown
Dalton	Free, LGPL	Fortran	Yes	Yes, LSDalton	No	Unknown	Unknown
DFTK	Free, MIT	Julia	Yes	Yes	Yes, CUDA, ROCm	Yes, HDF5	Unknown
DIRAC	Free, LGPL	Fortran 77, Fortran 90, C	Yes	No	No	Unknown	Unknown
DMol3	Commercial	Fortran 90	Yes	Unknown	No	Unknown	Unknown
FLEUR	Free, MIT	Fortran 95	Yes	Yes	Yes, OpenACC, CuBLAS	Yes, HDF5, custom	Yes, HDF5
FHI-aims	Academic, commercial	Fortran	Yes	Unknown	Yes	Unknown	Unknown
FreeON (formerly MondoSCF)	Free, GPL	Fortran 95	Unknown	Unknown	No	Unknown	Unknown
Firefly (formerly PC GAMESS)	Academic	Fortran, C, Assembly	Unknown	Unknown	Yes	Unknown	Unknown
GAMESS (UK)	Academic UK, Commercial	Fortran	Unknown	Unknown	Yes	Unknown	Unknown
GAMESS (US)	Academic	Fortran	Yes	Yes	Yes	Unknown	Unknown
Gaussian	Commercial	Fortran	Unknown	Unknown	Yes, CUDA	Unknown	Unknown
Jaguar	Commercial	Fortran, C	Unknown	Unknown	No	Unknown	Unknown
MADNESS	Free, GPL	C++	Unknown	Unknown	No	Unknown	Unknown
MOLCAS / OpenMolcas	Academic, commercial / LGPL	Fortran, C, C++, Python, Perl	Yes	Yes	Yes	Yes, HDF5	Unknown
MOLPRO	Commercial	Fortran	Yes	Yes	Yes	Unknown	Unknown
MOPAC	Free, LGPL	Fortran	Unknown	Unknown	Yes	Unknown	Unknown
MPQC	Free, LGPL	C++	Yes	Unknown	No	Unknown	Unknown
NESSIE	Free, BSD v2	Fortran	Yes	Yes	Unknown	Unknown	Unknown
NWChem	Free, ECL v2	Fortran 77, C	Yes	Yes	Yes, CUDA	Unknown	Unknown
Octopus	Free, GPL	Fortran 2008, C, C++	Yes	Yes	Yes, CUDA and ROCm	Yes, NetCDF	Yes, custom
ONETEP	Academic, Commercial	Fortran 2003	Yes	Yes	Yes, CUDA	Yes, HDF5	Unknown
OpenAtom	Academic	Charm++ (C++)	Unknown	Unknown	Yes	Unknown	Unknown
OpenMX	Free, GPL	C	Yes	Yes	No	No	No
ORCA	Academic, commercial	C++	Yes	Unknown	No	Unknown	Unknown
PARSEC	Free, GPL	Fortran	Yes	Yes	No	Unknown	Unknown
PQS	Commercial	Unknown	Unknown	Unknown	No	Unknown	Unknown
PSI	Free, LGPL v3	C, C++, Python	No	Yes	With plugin, BrianQC	Unknown	Unknown
PySCF	Free, BSD	Python	Yes	Yes	With plugin, GPU4PySCF	Unknown	Unknown
Qbox	Free, GPL	C++	Yes	Yes	No	Unknown	Unknown
Q-Chem	Academic, commercial	Fortran, C, C++	Yes	Yes	With plugin, BrianQC	Unknown	Unknown
QMCPACK	Free, UIUC/NCSA	C++	Yes	Yes	Yes, CUDA, HIP, SYCL	Yes, HDF5, XML	Yes, HDF5
Quantum ESPRESSO	Free, GPL	Fortran	Yes	Yes	Yes, CUDA	Yes, HDF5	Yes, HDF5
RMG	Free, GPL	C, C++	Unknown	Unknown	Yes, CUDA	Unknown	Unknown
SAMSON	Free	C++, Python	Unknown	Unknown	No	Unknown	Unknown
Scigress	Commercial	C++, C, Java, Fortran	Unknown	Unknown	No	Unknown	Unknown
SIESTA	Free, GPL	Fortran 2003	Yes	Yes	Yes	Yes, NetCDF	Yes, NetCDF
Spartan	Commercial	Fortran, C, C++	Unknown	Unknown	No	Unknown	Unknown
TeraChem	Commercial	C, CUDA	Unknown	Unknown	Yes, CUDA	Unknown	Unknown
TURBOMOLE	Commercial	Fortran, C, C++	Yes	Yes	Yes	Unknown	Unknown
VASP	Academic (AT), Commercial	Fortran	Yes	Yes	Yes	Yes, HDF5	Unknown
WIEN2k	Commercial	Fortran 90, C	Yes	Yes	No	No	No
Yambo	Free, GPL	Fortran	Yes	Yes	Yes, CUDA	Yes, HDF5, NetCDF	Yes, HDF5
Package	License^{†}	Language	MPI	OpenMP	GPU	I/O libraries	Parallel I/O

=== Quantum chemistry and solid-state physics characteristics ===
Package	Basis	Periodic^{‡}	MD	Semi-emp.	HF	TDHF	Post-HF	MP	MRCI	CC	DFT	TDDFT	GWA
ABINIT	PW	3d	Yes	No	No	Unknown	No	No	No	No	Yes	Yes	Yes Slater-type_orbital
ACES	GTO	No	No	No	Yes	Unknown	Yes	Unknown	No	up to Q	Yes	Unknown	Unknown
AMS: ADF, BAND, DFTB	STO, NAO	Any	Yes	Yes	Yes	Yes	Yes	Yes	No	No	Yes	Yes	Yes
AMPAC	Unknown	Unknown	No	Yes	No	Unknown	No	Unknown	No	No	No	Unknown	Unknown
Atomistix ToolKit (QuantumATK)	NAO, EHT, PW	Any	Yes	Yes	No	Unknown	No	Unknown	No	No	Yes	Unknown	Yes
BigDFT	Wavelet	any	Yes	No	Yes	Unknown	No	Unknown	No	No	Yes	Yes	No
CADPAC	GTO	No	No	No	Yes	Unknown	Yes	Unknown	No	up to D	Yes	Unknown	Unknown
CASINO (QMC)	GTO, PW, Spline, Grid, STO	any	No	No	No	No	Yes	No	No	No	No	No	No
CASTEP	PW	3d	Yes	No	Yes	Unknown	No	Unknown	No	No	Yes	Yes	Unknown
COLUMBUS	GTO	No	No	No	Yes	No	Yes	No	Yes	No	No	No	No
CONQUEST	NAO, Spline	3d	Yes	No	Yes5	Unknown	No	Unknown	No	No	Yes	Unknown	Unknown
CP2K	HybridGTO, PW	any	Yes	Yes	Yes	Unknown	Yes	Yes	No	No	Yes	Yes	Yes
CPMD	PW	3d	Yes	No	Yes	Unknown	No	Unknown	No	No	Yes	Unknown	Unknown
CRYSTAL	GTO	any	Yes	No	Yes	Unknown	Yes10	Yes	No	Yes	Yes	No	No
Dalton	GTO	No	No	No	Yes	Unknown	Yes	Yes	Yes	up to (T)	Yes	Unknown	Unknown
DFTK	PW	any	No	No	No	No	No	No	No	No	Yes	No	No
DIRAC	GTO	No	No	No	Yes	Unknown	Yes	Yes	Yes	up to (T)	Yes	Yes	No
DMol3	NAO	any	No	No	No	Unknown	No	Unknown	No	No	Yes	Yes	Unknown
eT	GTO	No	No	No	Yes	Yes	Yes	No	No	up to (T)	No	No	No
FHI-aims	NAO	any	Yes	No	Yes	Unknown	Yes	Yes	No	No	Yes	Unknown	Yes
Firefly (formerly PC GAMESS)	GTO	No	Yes	Yes	Yes	Unknown	Yes	Unknown	Yes	No	Yes	Unknown	Unknown
FLEUR	FP-(L)APW+lo	2d, 3d	No	No	Yes	No	Yes	No	No	No	Yes	No	Yes
FreeON (formerly MondoSCF)	GTO	any	Yes	No	Yes	Unknown	Yes	Unknown	No	No	Yes	Unknown	Unknown
GAMESS (UK)	GTO	No	No	Yes	Yes	Unknown	Yes	Yes	Yes	up to (T)	Yes	No	No
GAMESS (US)	GTO	No	Yes2	Yes	Yes	Unknown	Yes	Yes	Yes	up to (T)	Yes	Unknown	Unknown
Gaussian	GTO	any	Yes	Yes	Yes	Unknown	Yes	Yes	No	up to (T)	Yes	Yes	No
Jaguar	GTO	No	Yes	No11	Yes	Unknown	Yes	Unknown	No	No	Yes	Unknown	Unknown
MADNESS	Wavelet	No	No	No	Yes	Unknown	Yes	Unknown	No	No	Yes	Unknown	Unknown
MOLCAS	GTO	No	Yes	Yes	Yes	No	Yes	Yes	Yes	up to (T)	Yes	No	No
MOLPRO	GTO	No	No	No	Yes	Unknown	Yes	Unknown	Yes	up to (T)	Yes	Unknown	Unknown
MOPAC	Minimal GTO	any	No	Yes	No	Unknown	No	Unknown	No	No	No	Unknown	Unknown
MPQC	GTO	No	No	No	Yes	Unknown	Yes	Yes	No	up to (Q)	Yes	Unknown	Unknown
MRCC	GTO	No	No	Yes	Yes	Yes	Yes	Yes	Yes	arbitrary order	Yes	Yes	No
NESSIE	Finite Element	Yes	No	No	Yes	No	No	No	No	No	Yes	Yes	Yes
NWChem	GTO, PW	Yes (PW), No (GTO)	Yes	No	Yes	Yes	Yes	Yes	No	up to (Q)	Yes	Yes	Unknown
Octopus	Grid	any	Yes	No	Yes	Unknown	No	No	No	No	Yes	Yes	Yes
ONETEP	PW	3d	Yes	No	Yes	Unknown	No	Unknown	No	No	Yes	Unknown	Unknown
OpenAtom	PW	3d	Yes	No	No	Unknown	No	Unknown	No	No	Yes	Unknown	Unknown
OpenMX	NAO	any	Yes	No	No	Unknown	No	Unknown	No	No	Yes	Unknown	Unknown
ORCA	GTO	No	Yes	Yes	Yes	Yes	Yes	Yes	Yes	up to (T)	Yes	Yes	No
PARSEC	Grid	any	Yes	No	Yes	Unknown	No	Unknown	No	No	Yes	Unknown	Unknown
PQS	Unknown	Unknown	Yes	Yes	Yes	Unknown	Yes	Unknown	No	up to (T)	Yes	Unknown	Unknown
PSI	GTO	No	No	No	Yes	Yes	Yes	Yes	Yes	up to (T)	Yes	Yes	Unknown
PyQuante	GTO	No	No	Yes	Yes	Unknown	Yes	Unknown	No	No	Yes	Unknown	Unknown
PySCF	GTO	Yes	No	No	Yes	Yes	Yes	Yes	No	up to (T)	Yes	Yes	Unknown
Qbox	PW	3d	Yes	No	Yes	Unknown	No	Unknown	No	No	Yes	Unknown	Unknown
Q-Chem	GTO	No	Yes	Yes	Yes	Unknown	Yes	Yes	No	up to (T)	Yes	Yes	No
Quantum ESPRESSO	PW	3d	Yes	No	Yes	Unknown	No	No	No	No	Yes	Yes	Yes
RESCU	Grid, NAO, PW	Any	No	No	Yes	No	No	No	No	No	Yes	No	No
RMG	Grid	any	Yes	No	No	Unknown	No	Unknown	No	No	Yes	Unknown	Unknown
Scigress	GTO	Yes	Yes	Yes	No	Unknown	No	Unknown	No	No	Yes	Unknown	Unknown
SIESTA	NAO	3d^{12}	Yes	No	No	No	No	No	No	No	Yes	Yes	No^{21}
Spartan	GTO	No	Yes	Yes	Yes	Unknown	Yes	Unknown	No	up to (T)	Yes	Unknown	Unknown
TURBOMOLE	GTO	Yes	Yes	Yes	Yes	Yes	Yes	Yes	No	up to (T)	Yes	Yes	Yes
VASP	PW	3d	Yes	No	Yes	Yes	Yes	Yes	No	No	Yes	Yes	Yes
WIEN2k	FP-(L)APW+lo	3d	Yes	No	Yes	No	No	No	No	No	Yes	No	Yes
Yambo	PW	3d	No	No	Yes	Yes	Yes	Unknown	No	No	No	No	Yes
Package	Basis	Periodic^{‡}	MD	Semi-emp.	HF	TDHF	Post-HF	MP	MRCI	CC	DFT	TDDFT	GWA

=== Post processing packages in quantum chemistry and solid-state physics ===
Package	License^{†}	Language	Input	Output
ezSpectra	Free	C++	Interfaces with Q-Chem and other packages	Franck-Condon factors, photoionization cross-sections, photoelectron angular distributions, magnetic properties
Libwfa	Free	C++	Interfaces with Q-Chem and MOLCAS	Natural orbitals, natural transition orbitals, exciton descriptor, density difference, and others

== See also ==
- List of software for Monte Carlo molecular modeling
- List of computational physics software
- Comparison of software for molecular mechanics modeling
- Molecular design software
- Molecule editor – Program for simulating chemical structures
- Molecular modeling on GPUs – Using graphics processing units for molecular simulations
- List of software for nanostructures modeling
- Semi-empirical quantum chemistry method – Method in quantum chemistry
- Computational chemical methods in solid-state physics, with periodic boundary conditions
- Valence bond programs
- Car–Parrinello molecular dynamics – Computational chemistry software package

== Footnotes ==
^{†} "Academic": academic (no cost) license possible upon request; "Commercial": commercially distributed.

^{‡} Support for periodic systems (3d-crystals, 2d-slabs, 1d-rods and isolated molecules): 3d-periodic codes always allow simulating systems with lower dimensionality within a supercell. Specified here is the ability for simulating within lower periodicity.

^{2} QuanPol is a full spectrum (HF, MCSCF, GVB, MP2, DFT, TDDFT, CHARMM, AMBER, OPLSAA) QM/MM package integrated in GAMESS-US.

^{10} Through CRYSCOR program.
