= CADPAC =

Suite of computational chemistry programs

CADPAC, the Cambridge Analytic Derivatives Package, is a suite of programs for ab initio computational chemistry calculations. It has been developed by R. D. Amos with contributions from I. L. Alberts, J. S. Andrews, S. M. Colwell, N. C. Handy, D. Jayatilaka, P. J. Knowles, R. Kobayashi, K. E. Laidig, G. Laming, A. M. Lee, P. E. Maslen, C. W. Murray, J. E. Rice, E. D. Simandiras, A. J. Stone, M.-D. Su and D. J. Tozer. at the University of Cambridge since 1981. It is capable of molecular Hartree–Fock calculations, Møller–Plesset calculations, various other correlated calculations and density functional theory calculations.

== See also ==
- Quantum chemistry computer programs
