= CONQUEST =

CONQUEST is a linear scaling, or O(N), density functional theory (DFT) electronic structure open-source code. The code is designed to perform DFT calculations on very large systems containing many thousands of atoms. It can be run at different levels of precision ranging from ab initio tight binding up to full DFT with plane wave accuracy. It has been applied to the study of three-dimensional reconstructions formed by Ge on Si(001), containing over 20,000 atoms. Tests on the UK's national supercomputer HECToR in 2009 demonstrated the capability of the code to perform ground-state calculations on systems of over 1,000,000 atoms.

== Methodology ==
Instead of solving for the Kohn-Sham eigenstates as normal DFT codes do, CONQUEST solves for the one particle density matrix, $\rho(\mathbf{r},\mathbf{r}^\prime)$. To make the problem computationally tractable, the density matrix is written in separable form:
$\rho(\mathbf{r},\mathbf{r}^\prime) = \sum_{i\alpha j\beta} \phi_{i\alpha}(\mathbf{r}) K_{i\alpha j\beta} \phi_{j\beta}(\mathbf{r}^\prime)$, where $\phi_{i\alpha}(\mathbf{r})$ is a support function centred on atom i (with support functions on the same atom notated by $\alpha$) and $K_{i\alpha j\beta}$ is the density matrix in the basis of the support functions. The ground state is found as a series of nested loops:

• Minimise the energy with respect to the density matrix for fixed charge density and support functions
• Find self-consistency between charge density and potential
• Minimise the energy with respect to the support functions

The support functions are confined within spheres of given cutoff radius and the density matrix is forced to zero beyond a given range: $K_{ij} = 0, |\mathbf{R}_i - \mathbf{R}_j| > R_c$. These approximations give linear scaling behaviour, and as the radii are increased tend to the exact result.

== Developers ==
CONQUEST is jointly developed at the Department of Physics and Astronomy and London Centre for Nanotechnology, University College London in the UK and at the Computational Materials Science Centre, National Institute for Materials Science, Tsukuba, Japan. In the UK, the development team includes Dr. David Bowler, Dr. Veronika Brazdova, Prof. Mike Gillan, Dr. Andrew Horsfield, Mr. Alex Sena, Mr. Lianheng Tong, Mr. Jack Baker and Mr. Shereif Mujahed who are all members of the Thomas Young Centre; in Japan, the development team includes Dr. Tsuyoshi Miyazaki, Dr. Takahisa Ohno, Dr. Takao Ohtsuka, Dr. Milica Todorovic and Dr. Antonio Torralba.

Previous developers include Ian Bush, Rathin Choudhury, Chris Goringe and Eduardo Hernandez.

== See also ==
- Density functional theory
- Quantum chemistry computer programs
