= PySCF =

Python-based Simulations of Chemistry Framework (PySCF) is an ab initio computational chemistry program natively implemented in Python program language. The package aims to provide a simple, light-weight and efficient platform for quantum chemistry code developing and calculation. It provides various functions to do the Hartree–Fock, MP2, density functional theory, MCSCF, coupled cluster theory at non-relativistic level and 4-component relativistic Hartree–Fock theory. Although most functions are written in Python, the computation critical modules are intensively optimized in C. As a result, the package works as efficient as other C/Fortran-based quantum chemistry program. PySCF is developed by Qiming Sun. PySCF2.0 is the latest version of the program.

== See also ==
- Quantum chemistry software
