= Open Knowledgebase of Interatomic Models =

Scientific software framework

Open Knowledgebase of Interatomic Models (OpenKIM)
- Website type: Scientific research support
- Website: openkim.org
- Commercial: No
- Launched: 2009

The Open Knowledgebase of Interatomic Models (OpenKIM). is a cyberinfrastructure funded by the United States National Science Foundation (NSF) focused on improving the reliability and reproducibility of molecular and multi-scale simulations in computational materials science. It includes a repository of interatomic potentials that are exhaustively tested with user-developed integrity tests, tools to help select among existing potentials and develop new ones, extensive metadata on potentials and their developers, and standard integration methods for using interatomic potentials in major simulation codes. OpenKIM is a member of DataCite and provides unique DOIs (Digital object identifier) for all archived content on the site (fitted models, validation tests, etc.) in order to properly document and provide recognition to content contributors. OpenKIM is also an eXtreme Science and Engineering Discovery Environment (XSEDE) Science Gateway, and all content on openkim.org is available under open source licenses in support of the open science initiative.

== Motivation ==
Reliability, reproducibility, and accessibility are foundational to the success of science; in computational materials science these can be achieved through documentation of simulation setup, model parameters, and software version/settings information. The NSF actively supports the development of software and cyberinfrastructure that enable the documentation and distribution of this type of critical data or promote open and accessible science as part of the national Materials Genome Initiative (MGI). In solicitations related to the MGI, researchers are encouraged to "leverage existing cyberinfrastructures wherever appropriate and possible," including OpenKIM, The Materials Project and XSEDE

== Usage ==
OpenKIM provides tools for accessing the models and calculations stored in the OpenKIM repository, including the KIM API to allow applications that support the API to gain access to all of the data in a programmatic manner. A number of packages use these tools in order to streamline the process of developing new models, automate calculations of material properties, and develop educational tools for materials simulations. OpenKIM has been directly integrated into various prominent molecular modelling and potential fitting software including LAMMPS, ASE, DL_POLY, GULP, and potfit, and is recognized in the molecular modelling community as being a critical step towards improving accessibility and reproducibility in the field. A key aspect of OpenKIM is that in addition to model parameters, it also stores the complete source code of "portable models" in order improve to ensure complete reproducibility of simulations performed using given models.

== Notes ==
OpenKIM is a founding member of the Materials Science Community Forum, a community-led effort to promote open communication and collaboration in computational materials science and to support users of many of the main scientific software packages used in the field.

Interatomic potentials parameterizations are also available at the NIST Interatomic Potential Repository (NIST IPR), which provides an additional route to accessing some of the models which are also present in the OpenKIM repository.
