= Parallel I/O =

Parallel I/O, in the context of a computer, means the performance of multiple input/output operations at the same time, for instance simultaneously outputs to storage devices and display devices. It is a fundamental feature of operating systems.

One particular instance is parallel writing of data to disk; when file data is spread across multiple disks, for example in a RAID array, one can store multiple parts of the data at the same time, thereby achieving higher write speeds than with a single device.

Other ways of parallel access to data include: Parallel Virtual File System, Lustre, GFS etc.

== Features ==
=== Scientific computing ===
It is used for scientific computing and not for databases. It breaks up support into multiple layers including High level I/O library, Middleware layer and Parallel file system. Parallel File System manages the single view, maintains logical space and provides access to data files.

=== Storage ===
A single file may be stripped across one or more object storage target, which increases the bandwidth while accessing the file and available disk space. The caches are larger in Parallel I/O and shared through distributed memory systems.

=== Breakthroughs ===
Companies have been running Parallel I/O on their servers to achieve results with regard to price and performance. Parallel processing is especially critical for scientific calculations where applications are not only CPU but also are I/O bound.

== See also ==
- Converged infrastructure
- Dynamic infrastructure
