= Quantum ESPRESSO =

Software for quantum chemistry methods

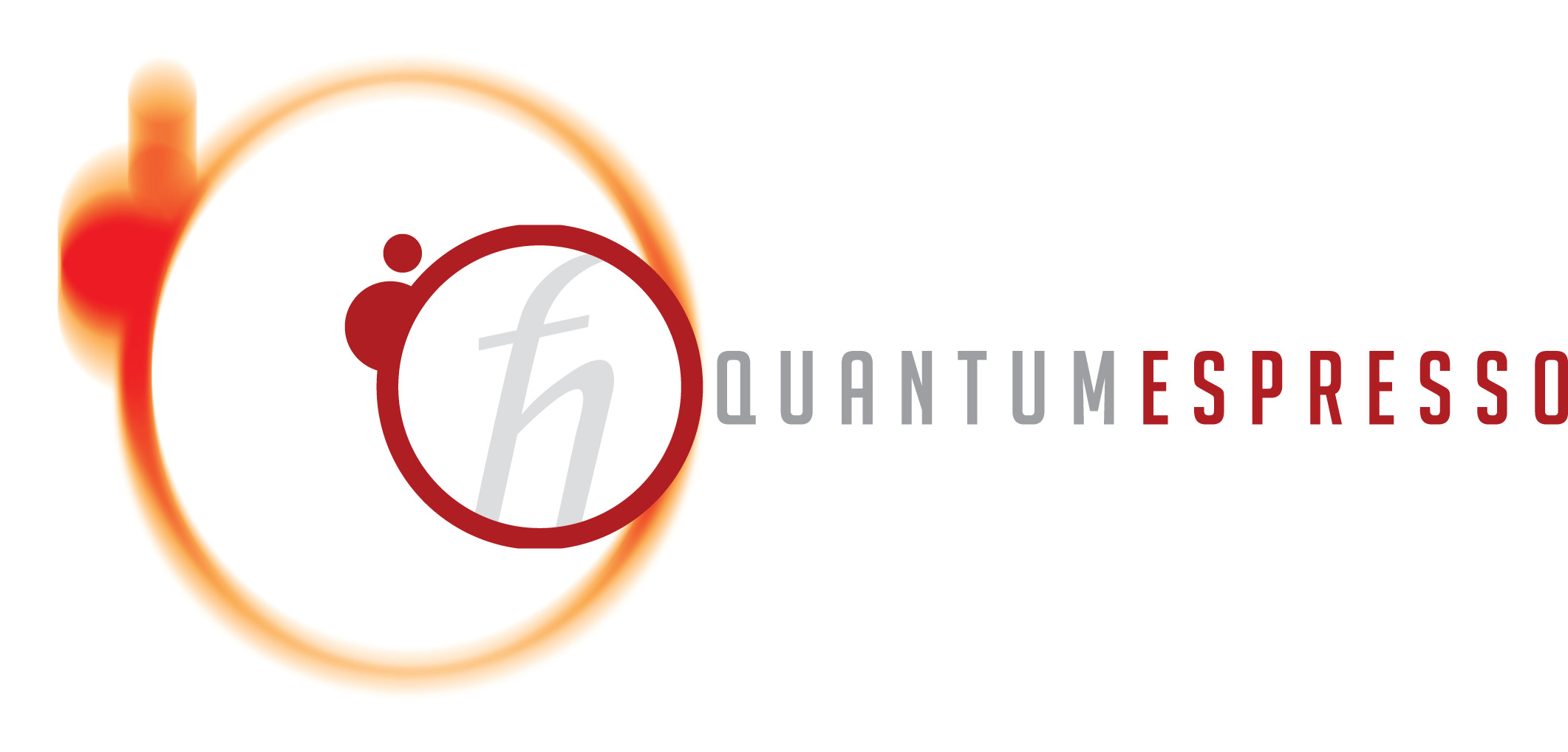
- Developer: Quantum ESPRESSO Foundation (QEF)
- Stable release: 7.5 / 19 August 2025; 14 months ago
- Written in: Fortran, C
- Operating system: Linux, macOS
- License: GNU General Public License
- Website: www.quantum-espresso.org
- Repository: gitlab.com/QEF/q-e

Quantum ESPRESSO (Quantum Open-Source Package for Research in Electronic Structure, Simulation, and Optimization; QE) is a suite for first-principles electronic-structure calculations and materials modeling, distributed for free and as free software under the GNU General Public License. It is based on density functional theory (DFT), plane wave basis sets, and pseudopotentials (both norm-conserving and ultrasoft).

The core plane wave DFT functions of QE are provided by the PWscf component (PWscf previously existed as an independent project). PWscf (Plane-Wave Self-Consistent Field) is a set of programs for electronic structure calculations within DFT and density functional perturbation theory, using plane wave basis sets and pseudopotentials. The software is released under the GNU General Public License.

The latest stable version QE-7.4.1 was released on 14 March 2025.

== Quantum ESPRESSO Project ==
Quantum ESPRESSO is an open initiative of the CNR-IOM DEMOCRITOS National Simulation Center in Trieste (Italy) and its partners, in collaboration with different centers worldwide such as MIT, Princeton University, the University of Minnesota and the École Polytechnique Fédérale de Lausanne. The project is coordinated by the QUANTUM ESPRESSO foundation, which was formed by many research centers and groups all over the world. The first version, called pw.1.0.0, was released on 15-06-2001.

The program is written mainly in Fortran-90 with some parts in C or in Fortran-77. It is composed of a set of core components, a set of plug-ins for advanced tasks, and a set of third-party packages.

The basic packages include Pwscf, which solves the self-consistent Kohn-Sham equations, obtained for a periodic solid, CP to carry out Car-Parrinello molecular dynamics, and PostProc, which allows data analysis and plotting. Noteworthy additional packages include atomic for pseudopotential generation, PHonon for density-functional perturbation theory (DFPT) and the calculation of second- and third-order derivatives of the energy with respect to atomic displacements, and NEB (nudged elastic band) for the calculation of reaction pathways and energy barriers.

== Target problems ==
The different tasks that can be performed include

- Ground state calculations
- Structural optimization
- Transition states and minimum energy paths
- Response properties (DFPT), such as phonon frequencies, electron-phonon interactions and EPR and NMR chemical shifts
- Ab initio molecular dynamics: Car-Parrinello and Born-Oppenheimer MD
- Spectroscopic properties
- Quantum transport
- Generation of pseudopotentials

== Parallelization ==
The main components of the Quantum ESPRESSO distribution are designed to exploit the architecture of today's supercomputers, which are characterized by multiple levels and layers of inter-processor communication. Parallelization is achieved using both MPI and OpenMP, allowing the main codes of the distribution to run in parallel on most or all parallel machines with very good performance. In recent years of development, Quantum ESPRESSO has increasingly adopted CUDA-based GPU acceleration across the different tools to improve performance.

== See also ==
- Quantum chemistry computer programs
- Density Functional Theory
