= CRYSTAL (software) =

- Stable release: CRYSTAL17 v1.0.2 / April 19, 2018; 6 years ago
- Available in: English
- Type: Density functional theory
- License: Proprietary
- Website: www.crystal.unito.it

CRYSTAL is a quantum chemistry ab initio program, designed primarily for calculations on crystals (3 dimensions), slabs (2 dimensions) and polymers (1 dimension) using translational symmetry, but it can also be used for single molecules. It is written by V.R. Saunders, R. Dovesi, C. Roetti, R. Orlando, C.M. Zicovich-Wilson, N.M. Harrison, K. Doll, B. Civalleri, I.J. Bush, Ph. D’Arco, and M. Llunell from Theoretical Chemistry Group at the University of Torino and the Computational Materials Science Group at the Daresbury Laboratory near Warrington in Cheshire, England. The current version is CRYSTAL23. Earlier versions were CRYSTAL88, CRYSTAL92, CRYSTAL95, CRYSTAL98, CRYSTAL03, CRYSTAL06, CRYSTAL09, CRYSTAL14, and CRYSTAL17.

== Program structure ==
The program is built of two modules: crystal and properties. The crystal program is dedicated to perform the SCF calculations, the geometry optimizations, and the frequency calculations for the structures given in input. At the end of the SCF process, the program crystal writes information on the crystalline system and its wave function as unformatted sequential data in Fortran unit 9, and as formatted data in Fortran unit 98. One-electron properties and wave function analysis can be computed from the SCF wave function by running the program properties.

The main advantage of the crystal code is due to the deep and optimized exploitation of symmetry, at all levels of calculation (SCF as well gradients and vibrational frequencies calculations). This allows significant reduction of the computational cost for periodic calculations. Note that while the symmetry generally reduces to identity in large molecules, large crystalline system usually show many symmetry operators.

== See also ==
- Crystal structure
- Mercury
- Quantum chemistry programs
