= DMol3 =

DMol^{3} is a commercial (and academic) software package which uses density functional theory with a numerical radial function basis set to calculate the electronic properties of molecules, clusters, surfaces and crystalline solid materials from first principles. DMol^{3} can either use gas phase boundary conditions or 3D periodic boundary conditions for solids or simulations of lower-dimensional periodicity. It has also pioneered the use of the conductor-like screening model COSMO Solvation Model for quantum simulations of solvated molecules and recently of wetted surfaces. DMol^{3} permits geometry optimisation and saddle point search with and without geometry constraints, as well as calculation of a variety of derived properties of the electronic configuration. DMol^{3} development started in the early eighties with B. Delley then associated with A.J. Freeman and D.E. Ellis at Northwestern University. In 1989 DMol^{3} appeared as DMol, the first commercial density functional package for industrial use by Biosym Technologies now Accelrys. Delley's 1990 publication was cited more than 3000 times.

== See also ==
- Quantum chemistry computer programs
