= Fragment molecular orbital =

Computational method in Chemistry

The fragment molecular orbital method (FMO) is a computational method that can be used to calculate very large molecular systems with thousands of atoms using ab initio quantum-chemical wave functions.

== History of FMO and related methods ==
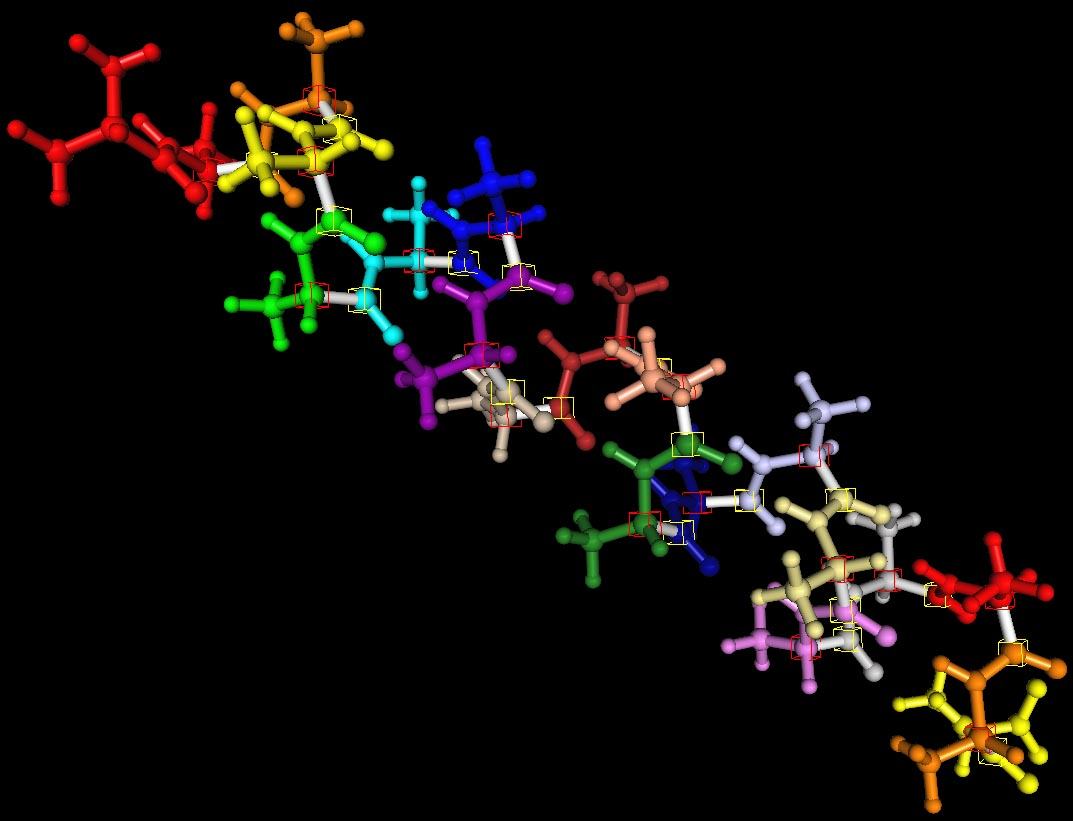
An alpha-helix fragmented for FMO using Facio.

The fragment molecular orbital method (FMO) was developed by Kazuo Kitaura and coworkers in 1999. FMO is deeply interconnected with the energy decomposition analysis (EDA) by Kazuo Kitaura and Keiji Morokuma, developed in 1976. The main use of FMO is to compute very large molecular systems by dividing them into fragments and performing ab initio or density functional quantum-mechanical calculations of fragments and their dimers, whereby the Coulomb field from the whole system is included. The latter feature allows fragment calculations without using caps.

The mutually consistent field (MCF) method had introduced the idea of self-consistent fragment calculations in their embedding potential, which was later used with some modifications in various methods including FMO. There had been other methods related to FMO including the incremental correlation method by H. Stoll (1992).

Later, other methods closely related to FMO were proposed including the kernel energy method of L. Huang and the electrostatically embedded many-body expansion by E. Dahlke, S. Hirata and later M. Kamiya suggested approaches also very closely related to FMO. Effective fragment molecular orbital (EFMO) method combines some features of the effective fragment potentials (EFP) and FMO. A detailed perspective on the fragment-based method development can be found in a review.

== Introduction to FMO ==
In addition to the calculation of the total properties, such as the energy, energy gradient, dipole moment etc., an interaction energy is obtained for each pair of fragments. This pair interaction energy can be further decomposed into electrostatic, exchange, charge transfer and dispersion contributions. This analysis is known as the pair interaction energy decomposition analysis (PIEDA) and it can be thought of as FMO-based EDA. Alternatively, configuration analysis for fragment interaction (CAFI) and fragment interaction analysis based on local MP2 (FILM) were suggested within the FMO framework.

In FMO, various wave functions can be used for ab initio calculations of fragments and their dimers, such as Hartree–Fock, Density functional theory (DFT), Multi-configurational self-consistent field (MCSCF), time-dependent DFT (TDDFT), configuration interaction (CI), second order Møller–Plesset perturbation theory (MP2), coupled cluster (CC), and density functional tight binding (DFTB). Excited states can be computed with Configuration interaction (CI), Time-dependent density functional theory (TDDFT), time-dependent DFTB (TD-DFTB), equation-of-motion coupled-cluster (EOM-CC), and GW approximation. The solvent effects can be treated with the Polarizable continuum model (PCM). The FMO code is very efficiently parallelized utilising the generalized distributed data interface (GDDI) and hundreds of CPUs can be used with nearly perfect scaling.

In the FMO book published in 2009, one can find 10 illustrated chapters written by the experts in the FMO development and applications, as well as a CDROM with annotated samples of input and output files, Facio modelling software and video tutorials (AppliGuide movies, showing mouse clicks) for treating difficult PDB files with Facio. In addition to this book, there are several chapters published in other books.

In 2013–2014, a Japanese journal, CICSJ Bulletin, published a series of FMO papers in Japanese (about 100 pages in total), which give a representative summary of the recent FMO development and applications done in Japan, including papers on the GAMESS/FMO interface in Facio and developing an OpenMP version of GAMESS/FMO on the K computer. Later, FMO was ported on the Fugaku and Summit supercomputers.

There are several reviews of FMO published in 2007, 2012, 2014, 2017, and 2022. Two new FMO books were published in 2021 and 2023.

The largest systems computed with FMO using DFTB are (a) a slab of fullerite surface containing 1,030,440 atoms, whose geometry was fully optimized and (b) a 10.7 μm white graphene nano material containing 1,180,800 atoms, for which Molecular dynamics simulations were performed.

To facilitate applications of FMO to drug discovery, FMO consortium was established.

== Applications of FMO ==
There are two main application fields of FMO: biochemistry and molecular dynamics of chemical reactions in solution. In addition, there is an emerging field of inorganic applications.

In 2005, an application of FMO to the calculation of the ground electronic state of photosynthetic protein with more than 20,000 atoms was distinguished with the best technical paper award at Supercomputing 2005. A number of applications of FMO to biochemical problems has been published, for instance, to Drug design, quantitative structure-activity relationship (QSAR) as well as the studies of excited states and chemical reactions of biological systems. The adaptive frozen orbital (AFO) treatment of the detached bonds was developed for FMO, making it possible to study solids, surfaces and nano systems, such as silicon nanowires. FMO-TDDFT was applied to the excited states of molecular crystals (quinacridone).

Among inorganic systems, silica-related materials (zeolites, mesoporous nanoparticles and silica surfaces) were studied with FMO, as well as ionic liquids and boron nitride ribbons. There are other applications of FMO.

== Software for FMO ==
The FMO method is implemented in GAMESS (US), ABINIT-MP, PAICS, and OpenFMO software packages, distributed free of charge.

Fu, is a general open-source GUI that can generate input files for FMO. Another graphical user interface Facio developed by M. Suenaga has a very convenient specialised support of FMO (in addition to other features), with which an automatic fragmentation of molecular clusters, proteins, nucleotides, saccharides and any combination thereof (e.g., DNA and protein complexes in explicit solvent) can be done in a few minutes, and a manual fragmentation of solids and surfaces can be accomplished by clicking the bonds to be detached. Facio can also visualise results of FMO calculations, such as the pair interactions.

== FMO implementation in GAMESS ==
(E – energy, G – gradient, H – Hessian; bold – can be used with PCM)

| | RHF | ROHF | UHF | GVB | MCSCF |
| Plain | **EGH** | **EG**H | **EG**H | - | EG |
| MP2 | **EG** | **E**G | **E** | - | - |
| CC | **E** | **E** | - | - | - |
| CI | E | - | - | - | - |
| DFT | **EGH** | - | **EG**H | - | - |
| TD-DFT | **E**G | - | E | - | - |
| EOM-CC | E | - | - | - | - |
| DFTB | **EG**H | - | - | - | - |

== See also ==
- GAMESS (US)
