= Valence bond programs =

Valence bond (VB) computer programs for modern valence bond calculations:-

- CRUNCH, by Gordon A. Gallup and his group.
- GAMESS (UK), includes calculation of VB wave functions by the TURTLE code, due to J.H. van Lenthe.
- GAMESS (US), has links to interface VB2000, and XMVB.
- MOLPRO and MOLCAS include code by David L. Cooper for generating Spin Coupled VB wave functions from CASSCF calculations.
- VB2000 version 3.0 (released, 2022), by Jiabo Li, Brian Duke, David W. O. de Sousa, Rodrigo S. Bitzer and Roy McWeeny allows the use of Group Function theory, whereby different groups can be handled by different methods (VB or Hartree–Fock). Many types of VB, including spin-coupled VB, and CASVB calculations are possible. It is part of the GAMESS (US) release and can be compiled into the GAMESS(US) executable. There is a more limited stand-alone program. Earlier versions were interfaced to GAUSSIAN.
- XMVB (previously known as XIAMEN), by Lingchun Song, Yirong Mo, Qianer Zhang and Wei Wu. This allows several VB methods, including breathing orbital VB. The code now interfaces to GAMESS (US) in a similar manner to VB2000. Earlier versions interfaced to GAUSSIAN 98.

Note that several other programs, as well as some of those above, can do Goddard's Generalized Valence Bond (GVB) methods. GAMESS (US) does this either without the VB2000 interface or with it.

== See also ==
- Quantum chemistry computer programs
