= Davidson correction =

The Davidson correction is an energy correction often applied in calculations using the method of truncated configuration interaction, which is one of several post-Hartree–Fock ab initio quantum chemistry methods in the field of computational chemistry. It was introduced by Ernest R. Davidson.

It allows one to estimate the value of the full configuration interaction energy from a limited configuration interaction expansion result, although more precisely it estimates the energy of configuration interaction up to quadruple excitations (CISDTQ) from the energy of configuration interaction up to double excitations (CISD). It uses the formula

$$\Delta E_Q = (1 - a_0^2)(E_{\rm CISD} - E_{\rm HF}), \$$

$$E_{\rm CISDTQ} \approx E_{\rm CISD} + \Delta E_Q, \$$

where a_{0} is the coefficient of the Hartree–Fock wavefunction in the CISD expansion, E_{CISD} and E_{HF} are the energies of the CISD and Hartree–Fock wavefunctions respectively, and ΔE_{Q} is the correction to estimate E_{CISDTQ}, the energy of the CISDTQ wavefunction. Such estimation is based on perturbation theory analysis. Therefore, CISD calculations with the Davidson correction included are frequently referred to as CISD(Q).

== Application ==
The Davidson correction is very popular due to its low computational cost. The correction improves the contribution of electron correlation to the energy. The size-consistency and size-extensivity problems of truncated CI are alleviated but still exist. In small molecules, accuracy of the corrected energies can be similar to results from coupled cluster theory calculations.

The Davidson correction does not give information about the wave function. Therefore, it cannot be used to correct wave-function-dependent quantities such as dipole moment, charge density and vibronic couplings. Analytical gradients for Davidson corrections are in general not available in quantum chemistry programs.

As with other perturbative approaches, the Davidson correction is not reliable when the electronic structure of CISD and the reference Hartree–Fock wave functions are significantly different (i.e. when $a_0^2$ is not close to 1). This happens when multi-reference character is significant or when CISD is used to calculate a state that is not the reference state, for example, an excited state or a state with different spin multiplicity.

== Size-consistency and size-extensivity problem ==
Davidson correction improves both size consistency and size extensivity of CISD energies. Therefore, Davidson correction is frequently referred to in literature as size-consistency correction or size-extensivity correction.

However, neither Davidson correction itself nor the corrected energies are size-consistent or size-extensive. This is especially the case in larger molecules, where contribution from higher than quadruple excitations becomes more significant.

== Corrections for Multi-reference CISD ==
Similar corrections exist for MR-CISD energies, including multi-reference Davidson correction, Pople correction, and others. These methods can be used to correct excited state energies.

== See also ==
- Configuration interaction
- Electron correlation
- Size consistency
- Size extensivity
