= Columbus (software) =

The Columbus programs are a computational chemistry software suite for calculating ab initio molecular electronic structures, designed as a collection of individual programs communicating through files. The programs focus on extended multi-reference calculations of atomic and molecular ground and excited states. In addition to standard classes of reference wave functions such as CAS and RAS, calculations can be performed with selected configurations. Some features employ the atomic orbital integrals and gradient routines from the Dalton as well as MOLCAS program suites. Columbus is distributed open-source under the LGPL license.

The Columbus programs are frequently used for nonadiabatic problems because of its ability to calculate MRCI nonadiabatic coupling vector analytically.

== Brief history ==
The Columbus programs were started in 1980 in the Department of Chemistry of Ohio State University by Isaiah Shavitt, Hans Lischka and Ron Shepard. The programs pioneered the Graphical Unitary Group Approach (GUGA) for configuration interaction calculations, which is now available in many other program suites. The programs are named after the city of Columbus, Ohio.

== Style ==
The Columbus programs maintain a program unique style that distinguish itself from most other quantum chemistry programs.

The program suite is a collection of a number of programs coded in Fortran, each can be executed independently. These programs communicate through files. Perl scripts are provided to prepare input files and to link these programs together to perform common tasks such as single point energy calculation, geometry optimization, normal mode analysis, etc. This style provides very high degree of flexibility which is embraced by advanced users. The open style allows new components to be added to the program suite with ease. However, such flexibility also increased the complexity of input file preparation and execution, making it very difficult for new users.

== Major features ==
- Hartree–Fock method (closed-shell and restricted open-shell)
- Multi-configurational self-consistent field (MCSCF) (quadratic convergence and state averaging)
- Multi-reference CISD for an arbitrary set of reference configurations (including a massively parallel version)
- Configuration interaction calculations are based on Graphical Unitary Group Approach (GUGA).
- Analytic gradients for MCSCF, MR-CISD, MR-ACPF and MR-AQCC
- Analytic MCSCF and MR-CISD nonadiabatic coupling vectors
- Support for electrostatic embedding QM/MM calculations
- Automatic geometry optimization, saddle-point searches
- Automatic searches for the minima on conical intersection seams.
- Spin/orbit configuration interaction

== See also ==
- Quantum chemistry computer programs
