= GAMESS (UK) =

GAMESS-UK
- Developer(s): Computing for Science Ltd. CCLRC Daresbury Laboratory
- Initial release: 1981; 44 years ago
- Stable release: 7.0 / 1 January 2010; 15 years ago
- Written in: C, Fortran
- Operating system: Linux, Mac OS X, AIX, Tru64 UNIX; Windows
- Platform: x86, x86-64, PowerPC, MIPS, SPARC, Alpha
- Available in: English
- Type: Computational chemistry
- License: Proprietary: freeware in UK; demo, serial, parallel, site-wide, joint software development
- Website: www.cfs.dl.ac.uk

General Atomic and Molecular Electronic Structure System (GAMESS-UK) is a computer software program for computational chemistry. The original code split in 1981 into GAMESS-UK and GAMESS (US) variants, which now differ significantly. Many of the early developments in the UK version arose from the earlier UK based ATMOL program, which, unlike GAMESS, lacked analytical gradients for geometry optimisation.

GAMESS-UK can perform many general computational chemistry calculations, including Hartree–Fock method, Møller–Plesset perturbation theory (MP2 & MP3), coupled cluster (CCSD & CCSD(T)), density functional theory (DFT), configuration interaction (CI), and other advanced electronic structure methods. Calculation of valence bond wave functions are possible by the TURTLE code, due to J. H. van Lenthe.

== See also ==
- CP2K
- GAMESS (US)
- Gaussian (software)
- MOLCAS
- MOLPRO
- MPQC
- NWChem
- PSI (computational chemistry) (Psi3)
- Firefly (computer program)
- Q-Chem
- Quantum chemistry computer programs
