= Barbatti =

Barbatti is a surname. Notable people with the surname include:

- Bruno Barbatti (1926–2020), Swiss scholar and writer
- Mario Barbatti (born 1971), Brazilian physicist, chemist, and writer
