= Complete active space =

Classification of molecular orbitals used in multireference quantum chemistry

In quantum chemistry, a complete active space (CAS) is a systematic partitioning of molecular orbitals used to construct multireference wavefunctions. Orbitals are divided into inactive (or core), active, and virtual subspaces. A chosen number of electrons is distributed among all configurations of the active orbitals, while inactive orbitals remain doubly occupied and virtual orbitals unoccupied.

The complete-active-space self-consistent-field (CASSCF) method was introduced in 1980 by Björn O. Roos, Peter R. Taylor, and Per E. M. Siegbahn. It provides a variational multiconfigurational reference wavefunction in which both the configuration-interaction coefficients and molecular orbitals are optimized. A subsequent Newton–Raphson formulation enabled the treatment of substantially larger CAS expansions.

CAS wavefunctions capture the dominant static (nondynamic) correlation associated with bond dissociation, open-shell species, transition-metal complexes, and electronically excited states, for which a single Slater determinant can be qualitatively inadequate. In principle, making every orbital active gives a full configuration interaction treatment; in practice, the rapidly increasing size of the configuration space restricts CAS calculations to selected orbitals.

The remaining dynamic correlation is commonly recovered through post-CASSCF methods such as CASPT2 or NEVPT2.

== Active-space selection ==
Selecting chemically appropriate active orbitals is a central practical challenge of CASSCF calculations. Christoph J. Stein and Markus Reiher at ETH Zürich proposed an automated procedure based on orbital-entanglement measures obtained from density-matrix renormalization group calculations. Related open-source software includes the Active Space Finder (ASF), which supports semi-automatic active-space selection for methods such as CASSCF.

== See also ==
- Multi-configurational self-consistent field
- CASSCF
- CASPT2
- NEVPT2
