= GAMESS (US) =

Software for computational chemistry

- Developer: Iowa State University Quantum Chemistry Group
- Release: 1 October 1977; 49 years ago
- Stable release: Jul 15, 2024 / July 15, 2024; 2 years ago
- Written in: Fortran, C
- Operating system: Windows; Unix, Unix-like: Linux, FreeBSD, Mac OS X
- Available in: English
- Type: Computational chemistry
- License: Proprietary freeware
- Website: www.msg.chem.iastate.edu/gamess

General Atomic and Molecular Electronic Structure System (GAMESS (US)) is computer software for computational chemistry. The original code started on October 1, 1977 as a National Resources for Computations in Chemistry project. In 1981, the code base split into GAMESS (US) and GAMESS (UK) variants, which now differ significantly. GAMESS (US) is maintained by the members of the Gordon Research Group at Iowa State University. GAMESS (US) source code is available as source-available freeware, but is not open-source software, due to license restrictions.

== Capabilities ==
Summary of some basic GAMESS (US) abilities C – conventional integrals storage D – direct atomic orbital (AO) integration p – parallel execution F – Fragment MO compatibility
SCFTYP=	RHF	ROHF	UHF	GVB	MCSCF
Energy	CDpF	CDpF	CDpF	CDp	CDpF
Analytic gradient	CDpF	CDpF	CDpF	CDp	CDpF
Numerical Hessian	CDpF	CDp	CDp	CDp	CDp
Analytic Hessian	CDpF	CDpF	CDpF	CDp	Dp
MP2 energy	CDpF	CDpF	CDp	No	CDp
MP2 gradient	CDpF	Dp	CDp	No	No
CI energy	CDpF	CDp	No	CDp	CDp
CI gradient	CD	No	No	No	No
CC energy	CDpF	CDF	No	No	No
EOM energy	CD	CD	No	No	No
DFT energy	CDpF	CDp	CDpF	No	No
DFT gradient	CDpF	CDp	CDpF	No	No
TD-DFT energy	CDpF	No	CDpF	No	No
TDDFT gradient	CDpF	No	No	No	No
MOPAC energy	Yes	Yes	Yes	Yes	No
MOPAC gradient	Yes	Yes	Yes	No	No
MRSF-TDDFT Energy	No	Yes	No	No	No
MRSF-TDDFT gradient	No	Yes	No	No	No

GAMESS (US) can perform several general computational chemistry calculations, including Hartree–Fock method, density functional theory (DFT), generalized valence bond (GVB), and multi-configurational self-consistent field (MCSCF). Correlation corrections after these SCF calculations can be estimated by configuration interaction (CI), second order Møller–Plesset perturbation theory (MP2), and coupled cluster (CC) theory. Solvent effect can be considered using quantum mechanics and molecular mechanics through discrete effective fragment potentials or continuum models (such as PCM). Relativistic corrections can be calculated, including third order Douglas-Kroll scalar terms.

The GAMESS (US) program possesses Resolution-of-the-Identity (RI) approximated methods, which decrease the overall cost of a method by projecting the ERI tensor into three center matrices. The RI approximation has been applied to the MP2 and CCSD(T) methods, respectively. The RI-MP2 and the RI-CC code benefit from a MPI/OpenMP parallelization model allowing for great scaling and fast calculations. The RI-MP2 method has a GPU enabled component in the latest public release of GAMESS.

GAMESS (US) also has a series of fragmentation methods that allow the user to target larger molecular systems by partitioning a large molecule into smaller, more feasible fragments. Examples are the fragment molecular orbital (FMO) method, the Effective Fragment Potential (EFP) method, and the Effective Fragment Molecular Orbital method (EFMO).

The GAMESS (US) software also provides a comprehensive bonding analysis technique based on the Quasi-Atomic Orbital (QUAO) analysis proposed by professor Klaus Ruedenberg. The QUAO analysis provides a quasi-atomical perspective of bonding molecular orbitals in molecules. These are oriented orbitals which show the bonding direction. QUAOs are characterized by their Bond Order (BO), Kinetic Bond Order (KBO) which is a measure of the strength of the bond, and their occupation number. The QUAO analysis allows users to study bonding patterns in molecules or small to medium size with a high degree of accuracy.

While the program does not directly perform molecular mechanics, it can do mixed quantum mechanics and molecular mechanics calculations through effective fragment potentials or through an interface with the Tinker code. The fragment molecular orbital method can be used to treat large systems, by dividing them into fragments.

It can also be interfaced with the valence bond VB2000 and XMVB programs and the Natural Bond Orbital (NBO) population analysis program.

The input files use a keyword based scheme. For example, $CONTRL SCFTYP=ROHF MAXIT=30 $END, which specifies that the SCF part of the code should do a restricted open-shell Hartree–Fock (ROHF) calculation and quit if the result does not converge in 30 iterations. The output is in an English language text file.

== See also ==
- GAMESS (UK)
- PC GAMESS, Firefly
- List of quantum chemistry and solid state physics software
