= Firefly (computer program) =

Chemistry program for Intel-compatible x86, x86-64 processors

- Original author(s): Alex A. Granovsky. Anastasia V. Bochenkova, James W. Kress
- Developer(s): Moscow State University, Chemistry Department
- Initial release: March 18, 1997; 28 years ago
- Stable release: 8.2.0 / September 19, 2016; 8 years ago
- Written in: Fortran, C
- Operating system: Windows, OS X, Linux
- Platform: x86, x86-64
- Available in: English
- Type: Computational chemistry
- License: Proprietary freeware
- Website: classic.chem.msu.su/gran/gamess/

Firefly, formerly named PC GAMESS, is an ab initio computational chemistry program for Intel-compatible x86, x86-64 processors based on GAMESS (US) sources. However, it has been mostly rewritten (60-70% of the code), especially in platform-specific parts (memory allocation, disk input/output, network), mathematic functions (e.g., matrix operations), and quantum chemistry methods (such as Hartree–Fock method, Møller–Plesset perturbation theory, and density functional theory). Thus, it is significantly faster than the original GAMESS. The main maintainer of the program was Alex Granovsky. Since October 2008, the project is no longer associated with GAMESS (US) and the Firefly rename occurred. Until October 17, 2009, both names could be used, but thereafter, the package should be referred to as Firefly exclusively.

== History ==
On December 4, 2009, the support of any PC GAMESS versions earlier than the first PC GAMESS Firefly version 7.1.C was abandoned, and any and all licenses to use the code were revoked. Thus, users of the outdated PC GAMESS binaries (version 7.1.B and all earlier releases) were required to discontinue using the PC GAMESS and upgrade to Firefly.

On July 25, 2012, a state of the art edition of Firefly, version 8.0.0 RC, was launched for public beta testing. A relative comparison has shown that it is far faster and more reliable than the prior edition, Firefly 7.1.G. Many changes were made to enhance its abilities.

In the Quantum Chemistry Speed Test, Firefly's DFT code came second (losing only to commercial QChem), beating other free DFT codes by a large margin. Firefly's unique capabilities include XMCQDPT2, a reformulation of Nakano's multi-state multi-configuration quasi-degenerate perturbation theory (MCQDPT) correcting for some of its deficiencies.

At the end of 2019, Firefly's main developer A. A. Granovsky unexpectedly died but the project continues.

== See also ==
- GAMESS (US)
- GAMESS (UK)
- Quantum chemistry computer programs
