= Windus =

Windus is a last name of English origin. It is a variant of the last name Wingers. The name is a metonymic occupational name for a textile worker or weaver, derived from the Middle English wyndhows ("winding house").

== People with the last name Windus ==
- Claron A. Windus (1850–1927), United States Army officer
- Theresa Windus, American chemist
- William Edward Windus, British poet and the Windus of Chatto and Windus
- William Lindsay Windus (1822–1907), British artist
