= MRCI =

MRCI may refer to:

- Microsoft Realtime Compression Interface, an optional hardware interface for Microsoft DoubleSpace/DriveSpace
- Multireference configuration interaction, a method in quantum chemistry
