= MOLCAS =

Computational chemistry software

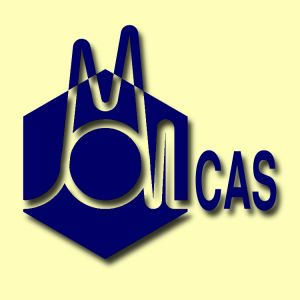
- Developers: Molcas developers community, maintained by Lund University
- Stable release: 8.6 / June 2023
- Operating system: Linux, Unix, Microsoft Windows, Mac OS X
- Type: Computational Chemistry
- License: academic
- Website: www.molcas.org

MOLCAS is an ab initio computational chemistry program, developed as a joint project by a number of international institutes. MOLCAS is developed by scientists to be used by scientists. It is not primarily a commercial product and it is not sold in order to produce a fortune for its owner (the Lund University).

Focus in the program is placed on methods for calculating general electronic structures in both ground and excited states. MOLCAS contains codes for general and effective multiconfigurational SCF calculations at the Complete Active Space (CASSCF) level, but also employing more restricted MCSCF wave functions (RASSCF). It is also possible, at this level of theory, to optimize geometries for equilibrium and transition states using gradient techniques and to compute force fields and vibrational energies. MOLCAS also contains second order perturbation theory codes CASPT2 and RASPT2.

== History ==
MOLCAS code has been created at the late 1980s by the group of Prof. Björn O. Roos at Lund University. The name of the program is a combination of Molecule (integral code by Jan Almlöf) and CAS (Complete Active Space program developed by Björn O. Roos).

MOLCAS 2 has been released at 1992. It was distributed on a tape for IBM VM/XA. It contains new configuration interaction code (written by Jeppe Olsen), new integral code (written by Roland Lindh) and coupled cluster code (written at Comenius University). MOLCAS 4 (1999) was a first release, which runs on any Unix or Linux operating system. In 2001 MOLCAS 5 has been released, featuring a distributed model for code development.

In September 2017 the bulk of the MOLCAS code was branched as open source (LGPL 2.1 license), under the name OpenMolcas. The stable version of MOLCAS code is distributed by Lund University.

== Major features ==
Main features of MOLCAS can be found at the Molcas website: manual, collection of tutorials. There are several publications featuring capability of different versions of MOLCAS:

. MOLCAS 7.2 has been independently reviewed at JACS computer software reviews.

- Ab initio Hartree–Fock (HF), Density functional theory (DFT), second order Møller–Plesset perturbation theory, MCSCF, MRCI, CC, Multiconfigurational reference 2nd order perturbation theory CASPT2 (including MS and XMS) and RASPT2 wavefunctions and energies
- Analytic gradient geometry optimization based on HF, DFT, CASSCF, and RASSCF wavefunctions
- Cholesky decomposition (CD) and Resolution of the identity (RI) techniques for HF, DFT, CASSCF, CC, MBPT2, and CASPT2.
- Analytical gradients and non-adiabatic coupling vectors.
- On-the-fly auxiliary basis function technique, atomic CD and atomic compact CD.
- CD/RI gradients for DFT functionals.
- Numerical gradient geometry optimization based on CASPT2 wavefunctions.
- Excited state energies for all wavefunctions, and excited optimized geometries from state averaged CASSCF wavefunctions.
- Transition properties in excited states calculated at the CASSCF/RASSCF level, using a unique RASSCF State Interaction Method.
- Solvent effects can be treated by the Onsager spherical cavity model or Polarizable continuum model (PCM).
- Combined QM and molecular mechanics calculations for systems such as proteins and molecular clusters.
- The NEMO procedure for creating intermolecular force fields for MC/MD simulations; these force fields include electrostatics, induction, dispersion, and exchange-repulsion terms and are based on calculations for individual molecules.
- Tully Surface Hopping Molecular Dynamics
- Method for localization and characterization of conical intersections and seams
- MOLCAS has interface to several computational codes, including DMRG codes, CheMPS2), MRCI code COLUMBUS, molecular dynamics code
- There are several Graphical User Interface codes for MOLCAS: and MolGUI.
