= Stephan Irle =

German-American scientist (born 1967)

- Born: July 13, 1967 (age 59)
- Education: University of Siegen; University of Vienna
- Scientific career
- Fields: computational chemistry nanomaterials
- Workplaces: Oak Ridge National Laboratory
- Doctoral advisor: Hans Lischka

Stephan Irle (born July 13, 1967) is a German-American scientist, known for his work in computational chemistry and nanomaterials.

== Education and early work ==
Irle earned a Bachelor of Science (1990) and a Master of Science (1992) in chemistry at University of Siegen in Germany and a Ph.D. in chemistry at the University of Vienna (1997), advised by Hans Lischka. He carried out postdoctoral research at Emory University with Keiji Morokuma (1997-1998) and was then employed by Emory as an associate scientist (1998-2006).

== Career and important contributions ==
Irle left Emory in 2006 for a research fellowship at Kyoto University in Japan. He was appointed as an associate professor at Nagoya University, eventually becoming a full professor in the chemistry department. In 2017 he returned to the United States and joined Oak Ridge National Laboratory, where he has been a group leader of the computational chemistry and nanomaterials sciences group since 2020. He teaches and advises students as an adjunct professor at Stony Brook University, University of Alabama, and the University of Tennessee. He has also held visiting positions at Bremen University in Germany (2012 and 2018), Harbin Institute of Technology in China (2012), and the National Institute for Fusion Science in Gifu, Japan (2008-2010).

At Oak Ridge, Irle studies nonequilibrium dynamics of molecular systems using quantum methods with a focus on soft matter, biosystems, chemical energy storage, and catalysis. His work employs quantum chemical methods and machine learning methods. His body of work includes over 300 peer-reviewed scientific papers. Among his most widely cited papers are articles on porphyrins and other conjugated systems, fullerenes and carbon nanotubes, and quantum molecular dynamics methods.

== Awards and honors ==
Irle is a fellow of the American Association for the Advancement of Science (2018).
