= Ernest R. Davidson =

American chemist

- Born: October 12, 1936 (age 90); Terre Haute, Indiana, US
- Education: Rose Polytechnic Institute; Indiana University Bloomington
- Known for: Davidson correction, Davidson diagonalization, computational methods in quantum chemistry
- Awards: National Academy of Sciences (1987); National Medal of Science (2001); Schrödinger Medal (2001)
- Scientific career
- Fields: Theoretical chemistry Quantum chemistry Computational chemistry
- Workplaces: University of Washington; Indiana University Bloomington
- Doctoral students: Philip Phillips

Ernest Roy Davidson (born October 12, 1936) is an American theoretical chemist known for the Davidson correction and the Davidson diagonalization method, both widely used in configuration interaction calculations. He was a professor of chemistry at the University of Washington and Indiana University Bloomington, and received the National Medal of Science in 2001.

== Early life and career ==
He was born in Terre Haute, Indiana, where he graduated from Wiley High School. He received a BS in chemical engineering from Rose Polytechnic Institute and earned a PhD in theoretical chemistry from Indiana University.

Davidson was a professor of chemistry at the University of Washington from 1961 to 1984 and again from 2002 to 2020, and at Indiana University Bloomington from 1984 to 2002.

== Research ==
His name is associated with both the Davidson correction, which estimates the effect of higher excitations on the computed energy, and the Davidson diagonalization method, which he developed and applied to configuration interaction. The method finds a few eigenvalues and eigenvectors of very large matrices and has become a standard component of ab initio configuration interaction programs.

His other computational contributions include an efficient method for evaluating integrals over Cartesian Gaussian basis functions and the iterative natural orbital method, which has been used worldwide for high-accuracy calculations. He also did pioneering work on the accurate description of spin and momentum distributions and of diradicals, and contributed to the theory of reduced density matrices.

He is the author of over 400 publications, including the monograph Reduced Density Matrices in Quantum Chemistry (1976).

== Honors and awards ==
His honors include a Guggenheim Fellowship (1974), fellowship of the American Physical Society (1976), membership in the International Academy of Quantum Molecular Science (1981), fellowship of the American Association for the Advancement of Science (1985), and election to the National Academy of Sciences (1987). Later honors include the American Chemical Society's Award for Computers in Chemistry (1992), fellowship of the American Academy of Arts and Sciences (1996), the Joseph O. Hirschfelder Prize in Theoretical Chemistry (1997), and the ACS Award in Theoretical Chemistry (2000).

In 2001, he was awarded the National Medal of Science and the Schrödinger Medal of the World Association of Theoretical and Computational Chemists.
