= Graphical unitary group approach =

Technique used in computational quantum chemistry

Graphical unitary group approach (GUGA) is a technique used to construct Configuration state functions (CSFs) in computational quantum chemistry. As reflected in its name, the method uses the mathematical properties of the unitary group.

The foundation of the unitary group approach (UGA) can be traced to the work of Moshinsky. Later, Shavitt introduced the graphical aspect (GUGA) drawing on the earlier work of Paldus.

Computer programs based on the GUGA method have been shown to be highly efficient. offering certain performance advantages over the older, sometimes called traditional, techniques for CSF construction. However traditional methods can offer other advantages such as the ability to handle degenerate symmetry point groups, such as $C_{\infty v}$.
