= Modern valence bond theory =

Revised theory in chemical bonding

Modern valence bond theory is the application of valence bond theory (VBT) with computer programs that are competitive in accuracy and economy, with programs for the Hartree–Fock or post-Hartree-Fock methods. The latter methods dominated quantum chemistry from the advent of digital computers because they were easier to program. The early popularity of valence bond methods thus declined. It is only recently that the programming of valence bond methods has improved. These developments are due to and described by Gerratt, Cooper, Karadakov and Raimondi (1997); Li and McWeeny (2002); Joop H. van Lenthe and co-workers (2002); Song, Mo, Zhang and Wu (2005); and Shaik and Hiberty (2004)

While molecular orbital theory (MOT) describes the electronic wavefunction as a linear combination of basis functions that are centered on the various atoms in a species (linear combination of atomic orbitals), VBT describes the electronic wavefunction as a linear combination of several valence bond structures. Each of these valence bond structures can be described using linear combinations of either atomic orbitals, delocalized atomic orbitals (Coulson-Fischer theory), or even molecular orbital fragments. Although this is often overlooked, MOT and VBT are equally valid ways of describing the electronic wavefunction, and are actually related by a unitary transformation. Assuming MOT and VBT are applied at the same level of theory, this relationship ensures that they will describe the same wavefunction, but will do so in different forms.

== Theory ==
=== Bonding in H_{2} ===
Heitler and London's original work on VBT attempts to approximate the electronic wavefunction as a covalent combination of localized basis functions on the bonding atoms. In VBT, wavefunctions are described as the sums and differences of VB determinants, which enforce the antisymmetric properties required by the Pauli exclusion principle. Taking H_{2} as an example, the VB determinant is

$$\left\vert a\overline{b} \right\vert = N \{a(1)b(2)[\alpha(1)\beta(2)] - a(2)b(1)[\alpha(2)\beta(1)]\}$$

In this expression, N is a normalization constant, and a and b are basis functions that are localized on the two hydrogen atoms, often considered simply to be 1s atomic orbitals. The numbers are an index to describe the electron (i.e. a(1) represents the concept of ‘electron 1’ residing in orbital a). ɑ and β describe the spin of the electron. The bar over b in $\left\vert a\overline{b} \right\vert$ indicates that the electron associated with orbital b has β spin (in the first term, electron 2 is in orbital b, and thus electron 2 has β spin). By itself, a single VB determinant is not a proper spin-eigenfunction, and thus cannot describe the true wavefunction. However, by taking the sum and difference (linear combinations) of VB determinants, two approximate wavefunctions can be obtained:

$$\Phi_{HL} = \left\vert a\overline{b} \right\vert - \left\vert \overline{a}b \right\vert$$

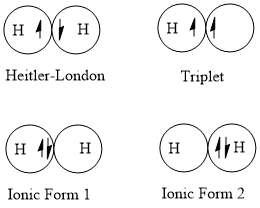
These are four valence bond structures that can contribute to the VBT description of bonding in a hydrogen molecule. The Heitler-London (covalent) structure is the largest contributor, while the ionic structures are minor contributors. The triplet structure is a negligible contributor.

$\Phi_{T} = \left\vert a\overline{b} \right\vert + \left\vert \overline{a}b \right\vert$

Φ_{HL} is the wavefunction as described by Heiter and London originally, and describes the covalent bonding between orbitals a and b in which the spins are paired, as expected for a chemical bond. Φ_{T} is a representation of the bond that where the electron spins are parallel, resulting in a triplet state. This is a highly repulsive interaction, so this description of the bonding will not play a major role in determining the wave function.

Other ways of describing the wavefunction can also be constructed. Specifically, instead of considering a covalent interaction, the ionic interactions can be considered, resulting in the wavefunction

$$\Phi_{I} = \left\vert a\overline{a} \right\vert + \left\vert \overline{b}b \right\vert$$

This wavefunction describes the bonding in H_{2} as the ionic interaction between an H^{+} and an H^{−}.

Since none of these wavefunctions, Φ_{HL} (covalent bonding) or Φ_{I} (ionic bonding) perfectly approximates the wavefunction, a combination of these two can be used to describe the total wavefunction

$$\Phi_{VBT} = \lambda\Phi_{HL} + \mu\Phi_{I}$$

where λ and μ are coefficients that can vary from 0 to 1. In determining the lowest energy wavefunction, these coefficients can be varied until a minimum energy is reached. λ will be larger in bonds that have more covalency, while μ will be larger in bonds that are more ionic. In the specific case of H_{2}, λ ≈ 0.75, and μ ≈ 0.25.

The orbitals that were used as the basis (a and b) do not necessarily have to be localized on the atoms involved in bonding. Orbitals that are partially delocalized onto the other atom involved in bonding can also be used, as in the Coulson-Fischer theory. Even the molecular orbitals associated with a portion of a molecule can be used as a basis set, a processes referred to as using fragment orbitals.

For more complicated molecules, Φ_{VBT} could consider several possible structures that all contribute in various degrees (there would be several coefficients, not just λ and μ). An example of this is the Kekule and Dewar structures used in describing benzene.

Note that all normalization constants were ignored in the discussion above for simplicity.

== Relationship to molecular orbital theory ==
=== History ===
The application of VBT and MOT to computations that attempt to approximate the Schrödinger equation began near the middle of the 20th century, but MOT quickly became the preferred approach between the two. The relative computational ease of doing calculations with non-overlapping orbitals in MOT is said to have contributed to its popularity. In addition, the successful explanation of π-systems, pericyclic reactions, and extended solids further cemented MOT as the preeminent approach. Despite this, the two theories are just two different ways of representing the same wavefunction. As shown below, at the same level of theory, the two methods lead to the same results.

=== H_{2} - molecular orbital vs valence bond theory ===
The relationship between MOT and VBT can be made more clear by directly comparing the results of the two theories for the hydrogen molecule, H_{2}. Using MOT, the same basis orbitals (a and b) can be used to describe the bonding. Combining them in a constructive and destructive manner gives two spin-orbitals

$$\sigma = a + b$$

$$\sigma^* = a - b$$

The ground state wavefunction of H_{2} would be that where the σ orbital is doubly occupied, which is expressed as the following Slater determinant (as required by MOT)

$$\Phi_{MOT} = \left\vert \sigma\overline{\sigma} \right\vert$$

This expression for the wavefunction can be shown to be equivalent to the following wavefunction

$$\Phi_{MOT} = (\left\vert a\overline{b} \right\vert - \left\vert \overline{a}b \right\vert) + (\left\vert a\overline{a} \right\vert + \left\vert b\overline{b} \right\vert)$$

which is now expressed in terms of VB determinants. This transformation does not alter the wavefunction in any way, only the way that the wavefunction is represented. This process of going from an MO description to a VB description can be referred to as ‘mapping MO wavefunctions onto VB wavefunctions’, and is fundamentally the same process as that used to generate localized molecular orbitals.

Rewriting the VB wavefunction derived above, we can clearly see the relationship between MOT and VBT

$$\Phi_{VBT} = \lambda(\left\vert a\overline{b} \right\vert - \left\vert \overline{a}b \right\vert) + \mu(\left\vert a\overline{a} \right\vert + \left\vert b\overline{b} \right\vert)$$
$$\Phi_{MOT} = (\left\vert a\overline{b} \right\vert - \left\vert \overline{a}b \right\vert) + (\left\vert a\overline{a} \right\vert + \left\vert b\overline{b} \right\vert)$$

Thus, at its simplest level, MOT is just VBT, where the covalent and ionic contributions (the first and second terms, respectively) are equal. This is the basis of the claim that MOT does not correctly predict the dissociation of molecules. When MOT includes configuration interaction (MO-CI), this allows the relative contributions of the covalent and ionic contributions to be altered. This leads to the same description of bonding for both VBT and MO-CI. In conclusion, the two theories, when brought to a high enough level of theory, will converge. Their distinction is in the way they are built up to that description.

Note that in all of the aforementioned discussions, as with the derivation of H_{2} for VBT, normalization constants were ignored for simplicity.

=== Perceived failures of valence bond theory ===
When describing the relationship between MOT and VBT, a few examples are commonly perceived as failures of VBT. However, these often arise from an incomplete or inaccurate use of VBT.

==== Triplet ground state of oxygen ====
It is known that O_{2} has a triplet ground state, but a classic Lewis structure depiction of oxygen would not indicate that any unpaired electrons exist. Perhaps because Lewis structures and VBT often depict the same structure as the most stable state, this misinterpretation has persisted. However, as has been consistently demonstrated with VBT calculations, the lowest energy state is that with two, three electron π-bonds, which is the triplet state.

==== Ionization energy of methane ====
The photoelectron spectrum (PES) of methane is commonly used as an argument as to why MO theory is superior to VBT. From an MO calculation (or even just a qualitative MOT diagram), it can be seen that the HOMO is a triply degenerate state, while the HOMO-1 is a single degenerate state. By invoking Koopman's theorem, one can predict that there would be two distinct peaks in the ionization spectrum of methane. Those would be by exciting an electron from the t_{2} orbitals or the a_{1} orbital, which would result in a 3:1 ratio in intensity. This is corroborated by experiment. However, when one examines the VB description of CH_{4}, it is clear that there are 4 equivalent bonds between C and H. If one were to invoke Koopman's Theorem (which is implicitly done when claiming that VBT is inadequate to describe PES), a single ionization energy peak would be predicted. However, Koopman's Theorem cannot be applied to orbitals that are not the canonical molecular orbitals, and thus a different approach is required to understand the ionization potentials of methane from VBT. To do this, the ionized product, CH_{4}^{+} must be analyzed. The VB wavefunction of CH_{4}^{+} would be an equal combination of 4 structures, each having 3 two-electron bonds, and 1 one-electron bond. Based on group theory arguments, these states must give rise to a triply degenerate T_{2} state and a single degenerate A_{1} state. A diagram showing the relative energies of the states is shown below, and it can be seen that there exist two distinct transitions from the CH_{4} state with 4 equivalent bonds to the two CH_{4}^{+} states.

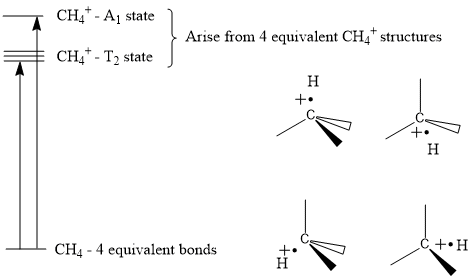
Two distinct states for CH_{4}^{+} exist (A_{1} and T_{2}), both of which result from the ionization of CH_{4}. This gives rise to the two unique peaks on the photoelectron spectrum of methane.

== Valence bond theory methods ==
Listed below are a few notable VBT methods that are applied in modern computational software packages.

=== Generalized VBT (GVB) ===
This was one of the first ab initio computational methods developed that utilized VBT. Using Coulson-Fischer type basis orbitals, this method uses singly-occupied, instead of doubly-occupied orbitals, as the basis set. This allows from the distance between paired electrons to increase during variational optimization, lowering the resultant energy. The total wavefunction is described by a single set of orbitals, rather than a linear combination of multiple VB structures. GVB is considered to be a user-friendly method for new practitioners.

=== Spin-coupled generalized valence bond theory ===
SCGVB (or sometimes SCVB/full GVB) is an extension of GVB that still uses delocalized orbitals, whose delocalization can adjust with molecular structure. In addition, the electronic wavefunction is still a single product of orbitals. The difference is that the spin functions are allowed to adjust simultaneously with the orbitals during energy minimization procedures. This is considered to be one of the best VB descriptions of the wavefunction that relies on only a single configuration.

=== Complete active space valence bond method (CASVB) ===
This is a method that often gets confused as a traditional VB method. Instead, this is a localization procedure that maps the full configuration interaction Hartree-Fock wavefunction (CASSCF) onto valence bond structures.

== Spin-coupled theory ==
There are a large number of different valence bond methods. Most use n valence bond orbitals for n electrons. If a single set of these orbitals is combined with all linear independent combinations of the spin functions, we have spin-coupled valence bond theory. The total wave function is optimized using the variational method by varying the coefficients of the basis functions in the valence bond orbitals and the coefficients of the different spin functions. In other cases only a sub-set of all possible spin functions is used. Many valence bond methods use several sets of the valence bond orbitals. Different authors use different names for these different valence bond methods.

== Valence bond programs ==
Several research groups have produced computer programs for modern valence bond calculations that are freely available.

== See also ==
- List of quantum chemistry and solid-state physics software
