= Mario Barbatti =

Brazilian chemist (born 1971)

- Born: December 28, 1971 (age 54); Petropolis, Brazil
- Education: Federal University of Rio de Janeiro
- Known for: Newton-X and Mixed quantum-classical dynamics
- Awards: Amidex Chair of Excellence ERC Advanced Grant Institut Universitaire de France
- Scientific career
- Fields: Theoretical Chemistry
- Workplaces: Aix Marseille University (current) Institut Universitaire de France (current) Max Planck Institute for Coal Research University of Vienna

Mario Barbatti (born December 28, 1971) is a Brazilian physicist, computational theoretical chemist, and writer. He is specialized in the development and application of mixed quantum-classical dynamics for the study of molecular excited states. He is also the leading developer of the Newton-X software package for dynamics simulations. Mario Barbatti held the Amidex Chair of Excellence at Aix Marseille University between 2015 and 2019, and has been a professor there since 2015.

== Honors and awards ==
- 2026: Senior member of the Institut Universitaire de France
- 2021: Fellow of the European Academy of Sciences
- 2021: Senior member of the Institut Universitaire de France
- 2019: Opening lecture of the XX Brazilian Symposium of Theoretical Chemistry
- 2019: ERC Advanced Grant. Mario Barbatti has been the first Brazilian scientist and the first computational chemist in France to receive this research grant.
- 2015: A*Midex Chair of Excellence

== Scientific contributions, interests, and production ==
By the end of 2025, Mario Barbatti had published over 200 scientific works, which had been cited about 16,000 times (h-index 65).

Since 2007, Barbatti has been the leading developer of the Newton-X platform, a software collection for dynamics and spectrum simulations, using surface hopping and the nuclear ensemble approach. Using dynamics and other quantum chemical methods, his research has focused on simulations of the ultrafast photochemistry and photophysics of organic molecules.

Among his main contributions, Barbatti, in collaboration with Hans Lischka, delivered a comprehensive map of the internal conversion channels of nucleobases. These results help to explain how DNA is stabilized after UV excitation.

Although Barbatti's research has been strongly oriented towards photoinduced processes in nucleic acids, he and his co-workers have contributed to many different sub-fields.

In 2013, in collaboration with Walter Thiel, they showed how UV irradiation can generate nucleobases out of inorganic components. Although this chemical reaction has been known since the 1960s, their work was the first one to unveil the exact reaction mechanism.

Barbatti also discovered a new internal conversion mechanism, allowing molecules to quickly return to the ground state. In this mechanism, a conical intersection between the ground and the excited electronic states is formed by an electron transfer from the solvent to the excited chromophore. This solvent-chromophore electron-transfer mechanism has been predicted to occur in 7H-adenine in water.

Barbatti and his colleagues at the Federal University of Paraiba have shown that CH...Cl hydrogen bonds can be formed in small molecules in the gas phase. This type of bond had previously been observed only in densely packed crystal structures.

He has also contributed on topics in organic photodevices, astrochemistry, and atmospheric photochemistry.

Currently, Barbatti and his team–the Light and Molecules group–are focusing on method developments, attempting to extend the excited-state simulation methods into the nanosecond regime. In a collaboration with Pavlo Dral and Walter Thiel, they implemented one of the first algorithms for nonadiabatic dynamics using machine learning.

== Popularization and presence in the media ==
Some of the main results from Barbatti's work have been picked up by diverse news outlets. These media have dedicated special attention to his research on internal conversion of nucleobases, prebiotic reactions, and new chemical reactions and mechanisms. His work is also publicized through blog posts on his group website and YouTube channel.

== See also ==
- List of Brazilian scientists
