= Philip Phillips (physicist) =

Theoretical physicist

Philip W. Phillips
- Education: University of Washington
- Known for: Condensed matter physics
- Scientific career
- Workplaces: University of Illinois at Urbana–Champaign
- Thesis: Application of many-body and interchange perturbation theory to phosphorescence (1982)
- Doctoral advisor: Ernest R. Davidson
- Website: http://people.physics.illinois.edu/Phillips/index.htm

Philip W. Phillips is a theoretical condensed matter physicist at the University of Illinois at Urbana–Champaign. He has contributed to the studies of various topics in modern physics including high temperature superconductivity and gauge–gravity duality.

== Early life and education ==
Phillips was born Scarborough, Tobago in the Republic of Trinidad and Tobago, and moved to the United States at age 10. He attended Walla Walla College, graduating with a B.A. degree in chemistry and mathematics in 1979. In 1981, he was awarded a Danforth-Compton Predoctoral Fellowship at the University of Washington. He received his Ph.D. in theoretical chemistry in 1982 from the University of Washington, studying phosphorescence lifetimes in small molecules.

== Professional career ==
Phillips was awarded a postdoctoral Miller Fellowship at the University of California, Berkeley and became interested in many-body phenomena in disordered systems. In 1984, he joined the faculty at the Chemistry Department at Massachusetts Institute of Technology as an associate professor, where he worked on Anderson localization. During his time at MIT, he was a visiting fellow at Balliol College at Oxford University, and was promoted to associate professor in 1990. In 1993, he joined the Department of Physics at the University of Illinois, Urbana-Champaign, where he became a professor in the Department of Physics in 2000. His research is in theoretical solid-state physics, focusing on understanding electron transport and magnetism in disordered and strongly correlated systems, particular strange metals in cuprate superconductors.

== Awards and accomplishments ==
In 1988, Phillips was awarded the Senior Xerox Award for Faculty Research, and became a Fellow at the Center for Advanced Study at the University of Illinois at Urbana-Champaign. In 2000, he received the prestigious Edward Bouchet award from the American Physical Society for "opening new vistas in the study of disordered and strongly correlated condensed matter physics, including the random dimer model and the size dependence of the Kondo effect.". He became a fellow of the American Physical Society in 2002, and a University Scholar in 2003. In 2005, he became a College of Engineering Bliss Faculty Scholar at the University of Illinois, and was a National Science Foundation American Competitiveness and Innovation Fellow from 2009-2011.

In 2012, he became a fellow of the American Association for the Advancement of Science. In 2020, he became a fellow of the American Academy of Arts and Sciences.

He was awarded the John Simon Guggenheim Fellowship in 2015.

== Publications ==
Philips is the author of Advanced Solid State Physics, a textbook that describes modern advanced-level solid state physics at the graduate level, with a focus on cutting-edge topics such as topological insulators, strongly correlated electrons, and electron transport, published by Cambridge University Press in 2012. He has also contributed chapters to four other books.

- Dunlap, David H.; Wu, H-L.; Phillips, Philip W. (1990-07-02). "Absence of localization in a random-dimer model". Physical Review Letters. 65 (1): 88–91. Bibcode:1990PhRvL..65...88D. doi:10.1103/PhysRevLett.65.88. ISSN 0031-9007. PMID 10042179.
- I. Martin, and P. Phillips, Residual Magnetism and High-Temperature Transport in M(PC)I Conductors, submitted to Phys. Rev. B.
- S. Knysh, D. Dalidovich, I. Martin, and P. Phillips, Local-field Approach to Superconducivity in a Two-dimensional Electron Gas. submitted to Phys. Rev. B.
- T. Stanescu, I. Martin, and P. Phillips, Charge-Density Wave Formation in a Quantum Hall Liquid, to be submitted to Phys. Rev. Lett.
- D. Dalidovich, and P. Phillips, Landau theory of bicriticality in a random quantum rotor system. Phys Rev B 59, 11925-35 (1999).
- P. Phillips, Y.Wan, I. Martin, S. Knysh, and D. Dalidovich, Superconductivity in a Two-dimensional Electron Gas, Nature 395, 253-257 (1998).
- G. Ortiz, Y. Wan, and P. Phillips, Reply to comment on "Pair Tunneling in Semiconductor Quantum Dots", Phys. Rev. Lett. 80, 3885 (1998).
- I. Martin, Y. Wan, and P. Phillips, "Size Dependence in the Disordered Kondo Problem, Phys. Rev. Lett. 78, 114-117 (1997).
- Y. Wan, G. Ortiz, and P. Phillips, The Origin of Pair Tunneling in Semiconductor Quantum Dots, Phys. Rev. B 55, 5313-5324 (1997).
- Lv, Weicheng; Wu, Jiansheng; Phillips, Philip (2009-12-11). "Orbital ordering induces structural phase transition and the resistivity anomaly in iron pnictides". Physical Review B. 80 (22) 224506. arXiv:0905.1704. Bibcode:2009PhRvB..80v4506L. doi:10.1103/PhysRevB.80.224506. ISSN 1098-0121. S2CID 119276556.
