= DFTB =

The Density Functional Based Tight Binding method is an approximation to density functional theory, which reduces the Kohn-Sham equations to a form of tight binding related to the Harris functional. The original approximation limits interactions to a non-self-consistent two center hamiltonian between confined atomic states. In the late 1990s a second-order expansion of the Kohn-Sham energy enabled a charge self-consistent treatment of systems where Mulliken charges of the atoms are solved self-consistently. This expansion has been continued to the 3rd order in charge fluctuations and with respect to spin fluctuations.

Unlike empirical tight binding the (single particle) wavefunction of the resulting system is available, since the integrals used to produce the matrix elements are calculated using a set of atomic basis functions.
