= Complete active space perturbation theory =

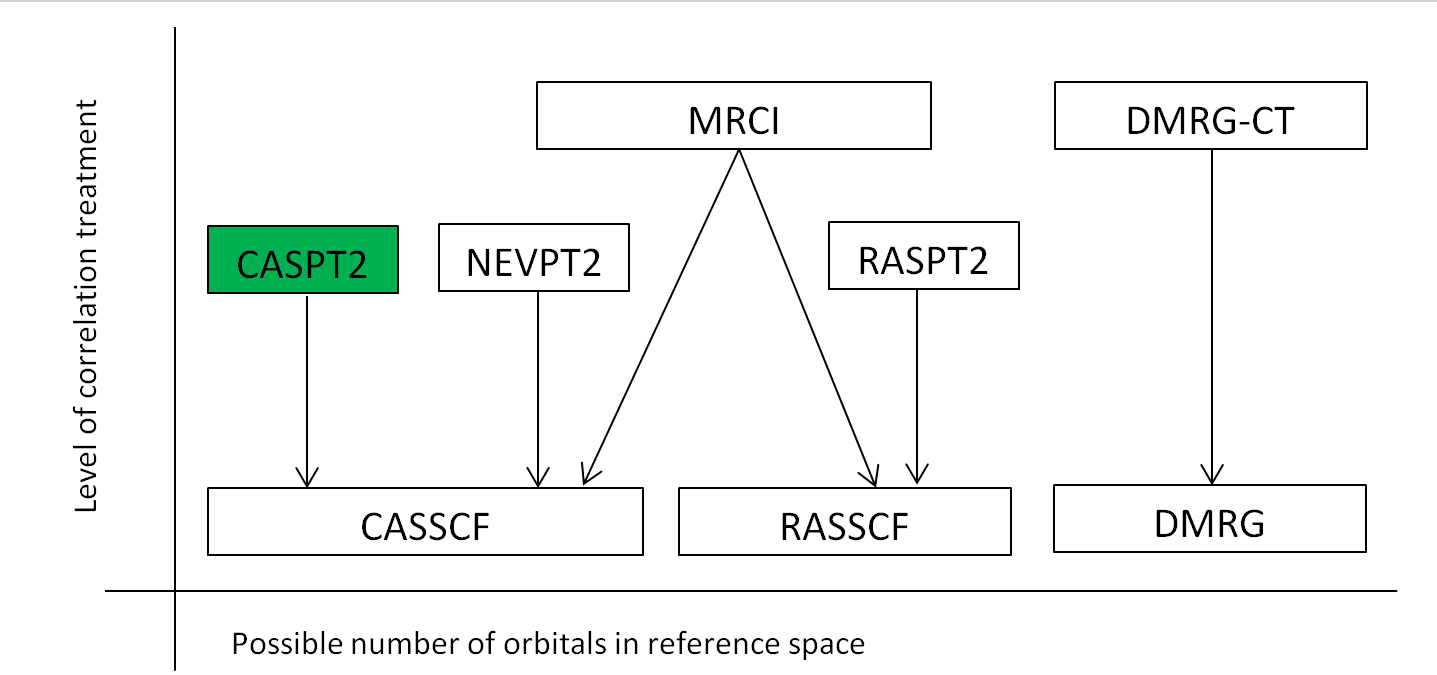
Sketch showing the interdependence of some multi-reference wavefunction methods, indicating the dependency on CASSCF of CASPTn method

Complete active space perturbation theory (CASPTn) is a multireference electron correlation method for computational investigation of molecular systems, especially for those with heavy atoms such as transition metals, lanthanides, and actinides. It can be used, for instance, to describe electronic states of a system, when single reference methods and density functional theory cannot be used, and for heavy atom systems for which quasi-relativistic approaches are not appropriate.

Although perturbation methods such as CASPTn are successful in describing the molecular systems, they still need a Hartree-Fock wavefunction to provide a valid starting point. The perturbation theories cannot reach convergence if the highest occupied molecular orbital (HOMO) and the lowest unoccupied molecular orbital (LUMO) are degenerate. Therefore, the CASPTn method is usually used in conjunction with the multi-configurational self-consistent field method (MCSCF) to avoid near-degeneracy correlation effects.

== History ==
In the early 1960s, the perturbation theory in quantum chemical applications was introduced. Since, there has been a wide spread of uses of the theory through software such as Gaussian. The perturbation theory correlation method is used routinely by the non-specialists. This is because it can easily achieve the property of size extensivity comparing to other correlation methods.

During the starting point of the uses of perturbation theory, the applications using the method were based on nondegenerate many-body perturbation theory (MBPT). MBPT is a reasonable method for atomic and molecular system which a single non-degenerate Slater determinant can represent zeroth-order electronic description. Therefore, MBPT method would exclude atomic and molecular states, especially excited states, which cannot be represented in zeroth order as single Slater determinants. Moreover, the perturbation expansion would converges very slowly or not at all if the state is degenerate or near degenerate. Such degenerate states are often the case of atomic and molecular valence states. To counter the restrictions, there was an attempt to implement second-order perturbation theory in conjunction with complete active space self-consistent field (CASSCF) wave functions. At the time, it was rather difficult to compute three- and four-particle density matrices which are needed for matrix elements involving internal and semi-internal excitations. The results was rather disappointing with little or no improvement from usual CASSCF results. Another attempt was made in 1990, where the full interacting space was included in the first-order wave function while zeroth-order Hamiltonian was constructed from a Fock-type one-electron operator. For cases which has no active orbitals, the Fock-type one-electron operator that reduces to the Møller–Plesset-Plesset Hartree-Fock (HF) operator. A diagonal Fock operator was also used to make a computer implementation simple and effective.
