= Bruno Barbatti =

Swiss scholar and writer (1926–2020)

Bruno Barbatti (27 September 1926 – 31 March 2020) was a Swiss scholar and writer. He was born in Zurich to an Italian father and a German mother. He studied at the universities of Fribourg, Paris (Sorbonne), Florence and Zurich, where he obtained a doctorate in German. For 35 years, he taught at the Kantonsschule Rämibühl, where he was once a student.

Barbatti is best known for his book Berber Carpets of Morocco. He did extensive field work in Morocco, especially Marrakech, where his wife Dominique was a high school teacher for several years. The couple built up an extensive collection of carpets over the years. Some were exhibited at Museum Bellerive in Zurich in 1996.

He married the French writer and teacher Dominique Abadie.
