= Theresa Windus =

American chemist

Theresa Lynn Windus
- Education: Minot State University; Iowa State University
- Scientific career
- Workplaces: Iowa State University; Ames Laboratory; Pacific Northwest National Laboratory
- Thesis: Strange bonding in a parallel world (1993)

Theresa Lynn Windus is an American chemist who is a distinguished professor at Iowa State University and the Ames Laboratory. Her research involves the development and use of high performance computational chemistry methods to tackle environmental challenges, including the development of new catalysts and renewable energy sources. She was elected a Fellow of the American Chemical Society in 2020.

== Early life and education ==
Windus was an undergraduate student at Minot State University, where she majored in chemistry, mathematics and computer sciences. She moved to Iowa State University for her graduate studies, where she considered chemical bonding in various molecular systems as well as early development of algorithms for the use of high performance computers in chemistry.

== Research and career ==
Windus worked at the Pacific Northwest National Laboratory, where she led the Molecular Science Software Group. She has developed advanced algorithms for high performance computing in chemistry and materials science.

In 2006, Windus joined the Iowa State University and Ames Laboratory. She currently serves as the Chemistry Department Chair at Iowa State University, the director of the United States Department of Energy Exascale Computing NWChemEx Project, and was involved with the creation of GAMESS. She has been responsible for the creation of computational chemistry software that can run on desktop to petascale and soon exascale computer systems. In 2016, she helped to create the National Science Foundation funded Molecular Sciences Software Institute (MolSSI), which looks to create open source software to support bimolecular simulations, quantum chemistry and materials science.

== Awards and honors ==
- 2017 Elected Fellow of the American Association for the Advancement of Science
- 2018 Distinguished Professor at the Iowa State University
- 2018 Liberal Arts and Sciences Dean's Professorship
- 2020 Elected Fellow of the American Chemical Society
- 2024 Elected Chair of the Chemistry Department at Iowa State University

== Selected publications ==
- Michael W. Schmidt; Kim K. Baldridge; Jerry A. Boatz; et al. (1993). "General atomic and molecular electronic structure system". Journal of Computational Chemistry. 14 (11): 1347–1363. doi:10.1002/jcc.540141112. Wikidata Q56017006.
- M. Valiev; E.J. Bylaska; N. Govind; et al. (2010). "NWChem: A comprehensive and scalable open-source solution for large scale molecular simulations". Computer Physics Communications. 181 (9): 1477–1489. doi:10.1016/j.cpc.2010.04.018. Zbl 1216.81179. Wikidata Q56485185.
- Karen L. Schuchardt; Brett T. Didier; Todd Elsethagen; Lisong Sun; Vidhya Gurumoorthi; Jared Chase; Jun Li; Theresa L. Windus (2007). "Basis Set Exchange: A Community Database for Computational Sciences". Journal of Chemical Information and Modeling. 47 (3): 1045–1052. doi:10.1021/ci600510j. PMID 17428029. Wikidata Q28649331.
