= Spin-orbital (disambiguation) =

Spin-orbital may mean:

- Spin-orbital, a type of orbital
- Spin (orbital), a movement of an orbital
- Spin (physics), a physics term
