= Intruder state =

In quantum and theoretical chemistry, an intruder state is a particular situation arising in perturbative evaluations, where the energy of the perturbers is comparable in magnitude to the energy associated to the zero order wavefunction. In this case, a divergent behavior occurs, due to the nearly zero denominator in the expression of the perturbative correction.

Multi-reference wavefunction methods are not immune. There are ways to identity them. The natural orbitals of the perturbation expansion are a useful diagnostic for detecting intruder state effects. Sometimes what appears to be an intruder state is simply a change in basis.
