= Generalized valence bond =

Quantum chemistry method extending valence bond theory

The generalized valence bond (GVB) is a method in valence bond theory that uses flexible orbitals in the general way used by modern valence bond theory. The method was developed by the group of William A. Goddard, III around 1970.

== Theory ==
The generalized Coulson–Fischer theory for the hydrogen molecule, discussed in Modern valence bond theory, is used to describe every electron pair in a molecule. The orbitals for each electron pair are expanded in terms of the full basis set and are non-orthogonal. Orbitals from different pairs are forced to be orthogonal - the strong orthogonality condition. This condition simplifies the calculation but can lead to some difficulties.

== Calculations ==
GVB code in some programs, particularly GAMESS (US), can also be used to do a variety of restricted open-shell Hartree–Fock calculations, such as those with one or three electrons in two pi-electron molecular orbitals while retaining the degeneracy of the orbitals. This wave function is essentially a two-determinant function, rather than the one-determinant function of the restricted Hartree–Fock method.
