= Configuration state function =

Linear combination of Slater determinants

In quantum chemistry, a configuration state function (CSF), is a symmetry-adapted linear combination of Slater determinants. A CSF must not be confused with a configuration. In general, one configuration gives rise to several CSFs; all have the same total quantum numbers for spin and spatial parts but differ in their intermediate couplings.

== Definition ==
A configuration state function (CSF), is a symmetry-adapted linear combination of Slater determinants. It is constructed to have the same quantum numbers as the wavefunction, $\Psi$, of the system being studied. In the method of configuration interaction, the wavefunction can be expressed as a linear combination of CSFs, that is in the form

$\Psi = \sum_k c_k \psi_k$

where $\psi_k$ denotes the set of CSFs. The coefficients, $c_k$, are found by using the expansion of $\Psi$ to compute a Hamiltonian matrix. When this is diagonalized, the eigenvectors are chosen as the expansion coefficients. CSFs rather than just Slater determinants can also be used as a basis in multi-configurational self-consistent field computations.

In atomic structure, a CSF is an eigenstate of

- the square of the angular momentum operator, $\hat{L}^2$
- the z-projection of angular momentum $\hat {L}_z$
- the square of the spin operator $\hat{S}^2$
- the z-projection of the spin operator $\hat {S}_z$

In linear molecules, $\hat{L}^2$ does not commute with the Hamiltonian for the system and therefore CSFs are not eigenstates of $\hat{L}^2$. However, the z-projection of angular momentum is still a good quantum number and CSFs are constructed to be eigenstates of $\hat{L}_z, \hat{S}^2$ and $\hat {S}_z$. In non-linear (which implies polyatomic) molecules, neither $\hat{L}^2$ nor $\hat{L}_z$ commutes with the Hamiltonian. The CSFs are constructed to have the spatial transformation properties of one of the irreducible representations of the point group to which the nuclear framework belongs. This is because the Hamiltonian operator transforms in the same way. $\hat{S}^2$ and $\hat {S}_z$ are still valid quantum numbers and CSFs are built to be eigenfunctions of these operators.

== From configurations to configuration state functions ==
CSFs are derived from configurations. A configuration is just an assignment of electrons to orbitals. For example, $1s^2$ and $1\pi^2$ are example of two configurations, one from atomic structure and one from molecular structure.

From any given configuration we can, in general, create several CSFs. CSFs are therefore sometimes also called N-particle symmetry adapted basis functions. For a configuration the number of electrons is fixed; let's call this $N$. When we are creating CSFs from a configuration we have to work with the spin-orbitals associated with the configuration.

For example, given the $1s$ orbital in an atom we know that there are two spin-orbitals associated with this,

$$1s\alpha \;\;\; 1s\beta$$

where

$$\alpha, \;\;\; \beta$$

are the one electron spin-eigenfunctions for spin-up and spin-down respectively. Similarly, for the $1\pi$ orbital in a linear molecule ($C_{\infty v}$ point group) we have four spin orbitals:

$$1\pi(+)\alpha, \; 1\pi(+)\beta, \; 1\pi(-)\alpha, \; 1\pi(-)\beta$$.

This is because the $\pi$ designation corresponds to z-projection of angular momentum of both $+1$ and $-1$.

We can think of the set of spin orbitals as a set of boxes each of size one; let's call this $M$ boxes. We distribute the $N$ electrons among the $M$ boxes in all possible ways. Each assignment corresponds to one Slater determinant, $D_i$. There can be great number of these, particularly when $N << M$. Another way to look at this is to say we have $M$ entities and we wish to select $N$ of them, known as a combination. We need to find all possible combinations. Order of the selection is not significant because we are working with determinants and can interchange rows as required.

If we then specify the overall coupling that we wish to achieve for the configuration, we can now select only those Slater determinants that have the required quantum numbers. In order to achieve the required total spin angular momentum (and in the case of atoms the total orbital angular momentum as well), each Slater determinant has to be premultiplied by a coupling coefficient $c_i$, derived ultimately from Clebsch–Gordan coefficients. Thus the CSF is a linear combination

$$\sum_i c_i \; D_i$$.

The Lowdin projection operator formalism may be used to find the coefficients. For any given set of determinants $D_i$ it may be possible to find several different sets of coefficients. Each set corresponds to one CSF. In fact this simply reflects the different internal couplings of total spin and spatial angular momentum.

== A genealogical algorithm for CSF construction ==
At the most fundamental level, a configuration state function can be constructed from a set of $M$ orbitals and a number $N$ of electrons using the following genealogical algorithm:

1. distribute the $N$ electrons over the set of $M$ orbitals giving a configuration
2. for each orbital the possible quantum number couplings (and therefore wavefunctions for the individual orbitals) are known from basic quantum mechanics; for each orbital choose one of the permitted couplings but leave the z-component of the total spin, $S_z$ undefined.
3. check that the spatial coupling of all orbitals matches that required for the system wavefunction. For a molecule exhibiting $C_{\infty v}$ or $D_{\infty h}$ this is achieved by a simple linear summation of the coupled $\lambda$ value for each orbital; for molecules whose nuclear framework transforms according to $D_{2h}$ symmetry, or one of its sub-groups, the group product table has to be used to find the product of the irreducible representation of all $N$ orbitals.
4. couple the total spins of the $N$ orbitals from left to right; this means we have to choose a fixed $S_z$ for each orbital.
5. test the final total spin and its z-projection against the values required for the system wavefunction

The above steps will need to be repeated many times to elucidate the total set of CSFs that can be derived from the $N$ electrons and $M$ orbitals.

== Single orbital configurations and wavefunctions ==
Basic quantum mechanics defines the possible single orbital wavefunctions. In a software implementation, these can be provided either as a table or through a set of logic statements. Alternatively group theory may be used to compute them. Electrons in a single orbital are called equivalent electrons. They obey the same coupling rules as other electrons but the Pauli exclusion principle makes certain couplings impossible. The Pauli exclusion principle requires that no two electrons in a system can have all their quantum numbers equal. For equivalent electrons, by definition the principal quantum number is identical. In atoms the angular momentum is also identical. So, for equivalent electrons the z components of spin and spatial parts, taken together, must differ.

The following table shows the possible couplings for a $\sigma$ orbital with one or two electrons.

Orbital Configuration	Term symbol	$S_z$ projection
$\sigma^1$	$^{2}\Sigma^{+}$	$\;\;\frac{1}{2}$
$\sigma^1$	$^{2}\Sigma^{-}$	$-\frac{1}{2}$
$\sigma^2$	$^{1}\Sigma^{+}$	$0$

The situation for orbitals in Abelian point groups mirrors the above table. The next table shows the fifteen possible couplings for a $\pi$ orbital. The $\delta, \phi, \gamma, \ldots$ orbitals also each generate fifteen possible couplings, all of which can be easily inferred from this table.

Orbital Configuration	Term symbol	Lambda coupling	$S_z$ projection
$\pi^1$	$^{2}\Pi$	$+1$	$\frac{1}{2}$
$\pi^1$	$^{2}\Pi$	$+1$	$-\frac{1}{2}$
$\pi^1$	$^{2}\Pi$	$-1$	$\frac{1}{2}$
$\pi^1$	$^{2}\Pi$	$-1$	$-\frac{1}{2}$
$\pi^2$	$^{3}\Sigma^{-}$	$0$	$+1$
$\pi^2$	$^{3}\Sigma^{-}$	$0$	$0$
$\pi^2$	$^{3}\Sigma^{-}$	$0$	$-1$
$\pi^2$	$^{1}\Delta$	$+2$	$0$
$\pi^2$	$^{1}\Delta$	$-2$	$0$
$\pi^2$	$^{1}\Sigma^{+}$	$0$	$0$
$\pi^3$	$^{2}\Pi$	$+1$	$\frac{1}{2}$
$\pi^3$	$^{2}\Pi$	$+1$	$-\frac{1}{2}$
$\pi^3$	$^{2}\Pi$	$-1$	$\frac{1}{2}$
$\pi^3$	$^{2}\Pi$	$-1$	$-\frac{1}{2}$
$\pi^4$	$^{1}\Sigma^{+}$	$0$	$0$

Similar tables can be constructed for atomic systems, which transform according to the point group of the sphere, that is for s, p, d, f $\ldots$ orbitals. The number of term symbols and therefore possible couplings is significantly larger in the atomic case.

== Computer software for CSF generation ==
Computer programs are readily available to generate CSFs for atoms for molecules and for electron and positron scattering by molecules. A popular computational method for CSF construction is the Graphical Unitary Group Approach.
