= Electronic correlation =

Interaction between electrons, often complicating physical calculations

Electronic correlation is the interaction between electrons in the electronic structure of a quantum system. The correlation energy is a measure of how much the movement of one electron is influenced by the presence of all other electrons.

== Atomic and molecular systems ==
Electron correlation energy in terms of various levels of theory of solutions for the Schrödinger equation.

Within the Hartree–Fock method of quantum chemistry, the antisymmetric wave function is approximated by a single Slater determinant. Exact wave functions, however, cannot generally be expressed as single determinants. The single-determinant approximation does not take into account Coulomb correlation, leading to a total electronic energy different from the exact solution of the non-relativistic Schrödinger equation within the Born–Oppenheimer approximation. Therefore, the Hartree–Fock limit is always above this exact energy. The difference is called the correlation energy, a term coined by Löwdin. The concept of the correlation energy was studied earlier by Wigner.

A certain amount of electron correlation is already considered within the HF approximation, found in the electron exchange term describing the correlation between electrons with parallel spin. This basic correlation prevents two parallel-spin electrons from being found at the same point in space and is often called Pauli correlation. Coulomb correlation, on the other hand, describes the correlation between the spatial position of electrons due to their Coulomb repulsion, and is responsible for chemically important effects such as London dispersion. There is also a correlation related to the overall symmetry or total spin of the considered system.

The word correlation energy has to be used with caution. First it is usually defined as the energy difference of a correlated method relative to the Hartree–Fock energy. But this is not the full correlation energy because some correlation is already included in HF. Secondly the correlation energy is highly dependent on the basis set used. The "exact" energy is the energy with full correlation and complete basis set.

Electron correlation is sometimes divided into dynamical and non-dynamical (static) correlation. Dynamical correlation is the correlation of the movement of electrons and is described under electron correlation dynamics and also with the configuration interaction (CI) method. Static correlation is important for molecules whose ground state is well described only with more than one (nearly) degenerate determinant. In this case the Hartree–Fock wavefunction (only one determinant) is qualitatively wrong. The multi-configurational self-consistent field (MCSCF) method takes account of this static correlation, but not dynamical correlation.

If one wants to calculate excitation energies (energy differences between the ground and excited states) one has to be careful that both states are equally balanced (e.g., Multireference configuration interaction).

=== Methods ===
In simple terms, the molecular orbitals of the Hartree–Fock method are optimized by evaluating the energy of an electron in each molecular orbital moving in the mean field of all other electrons, rather than including the instantaneous repulsion between electrons.

To account for electron correlation, there are many post-Hartree–Fock methods, including:

- configuration interaction (CI)

One of the most important methods for correcting for the missing correlation is the configuration interaction (CI) method. Starting with the Hartree–Fock wavefunction as the ground determinant, one takes a linear combination of the ground and excited determinants $\Phi_I$ as the correlated wavefunction and optimizes the weighting factors $c_I$ according to the Variational Principle. When taking all possible excited determinants, one speaks of Full-CI. In a Full-CI wavefunction all electrons are fully correlated. For non-small molecules, Full-CI is much too computationally expensive. One truncates the CI expansion and gets well-correlated wavefunctions and well-correlated energies according to the level of truncation.

- Møller–Plesset perturbation theory (MP2, MP3, MP4, etc.)

Perturbation theory gives correlated energies, but no new wavefunctions. PT is not variational. This means the calculated energy is not an upper bound for the exact energy. It is possible to partition Møller–Plesset perturbation theory energies via Interacting Quantum Atoms (IQA) energy partitioning (although most commonly the correlation energy is not partitioned). This is an extension to the theory of Atoms in Molecules. IQA energy partitioning enables one to look in detail at the correlation energy contributions from individual atoms and atomic interactions. IQA correlation energy partitioning has also been shown to be possible with coupled cluster methods.

- multi-configurational self-consistent field (MCSCF)

There are also combinations possible. E.g. one can have some nearly degenerate determinants for the multi-configurational self-consistent field method to account for static correlation and/or some truncated CI method for the biggest part of dynamical correlation and/or on top some perturbational ansatz for small perturbing (unimportant) determinants. Examples for those combinations are CASPT2 and SORCI.

- Explicitly correlated wavefunction (R12 method)

This approach includes a term depending on interelectron distance into wavefunction. This leads to faster convergence in terms of basis set size than pure gaussian-type basis set, but requires calculation of more complex integrals. To simplify them, interelectron distances are expanded into a series making for simpler integrals. The idea of R12 methods is quite old, but practical implementations begun to appear only recently.

== Crystalline systems ==
In condensed matter physics, electrons are typically described with reference to a periodic lattice of atomic nuclei. Non-interacting electrons are therefore typically described by Bloch waves, which correspond to the delocalized, symmetry adapted molecular orbitals used in molecules (while Wannier functions correspond to localized molecular orbitals). A number of important theoretical approximations have been proposed to explain electron correlations in these crystalline systems.

The Fermi liquid model of correlated electrons in metals is able to explain the temperature dependence of resistivity by electron-electron interactions. It also forms the basis for the BCS theory of superconductivity, which is the result of phonon-mediated electron-electron interactions.

Systems that escape a Fermi liquid description are said to be strongly-correlated. In them, interactions plays such an important role that qualitatively new phenomena emerge. This is the case, for example, when the electrons are close to a metal-insulator transition. The Hubbard model is based on the tight-binding approximation, and can explain conductor-insulator transitions in Mott insulators such as transition metal oxides by the presence of repulsive Coulombic interactions between electrons. Its one-dimensional version is considered an archetype of the strong-correlations problem and displays many dramatic manifestations such as quasi-particle fractionalization. However, there is no exact solution of the Hubbard model in more than one dimension.

The RKKY interaction can explain electron spin correlations between unpaired inner shell electrons in different atoms in a conducting crystal by a second-order interaction that is mediated by conduction electrons.

The Tomonaga–Luttinger liquid model approximates second order electron-electron interactions as bosonic interactions.

== Mathematical viewpoint ==
For two independent electrons a and b,

$$\rho(\mathbf{r}_a,\mathbf{r}_b) \sim \rho(\mathbf{r}_a)\rho(\mathbf{r}_b), \,$$

where ρ(r_{a},r_{b}) represents the joint electronic density, or the probability density of finding electron a at r_{a} and electron b at r_{b}. Within this notation, ρ(r_{a},r_{b}) dr_{a} dr_{b} represents the probability of finding the two electrons in their respective volume elements dr_{a} and dr_{b}.

If these two electrons are correlated, then the probability of finding electron a at a certain position in space depends on the position of electron b, and vice versa. In other words, the product of their independent density functions does not adequately describe the real situation. At small distances, the uncorrelated pair density is too large; at large distances, the uncorrelated pair density is too small (i.e. the electrons tend to "avoid each other").

== See also ==
- Configuration interaction
- Coupled cluster
- Hartree–Fock
- Møller–Plesset perturbation theory
- Post-Hartree–Fock
- Quantum Monte Carlo
- Strongly correlated material
