= Size consistency and size extensivity =

In quantum chemistry, size consistency and size extensivity are concepts relating to how the behaviour of quantum-chemistry calculations changes with the system size. Size consistency (or strict separability) is a property that guarantees the consistency of the energy behaviour when interaction between the involved molecular subsystems is nullified (for example, by distance). Size extensivity, introduced by Bartlett, is a more mathematically formal characteristic which refers to the correct (linear) scaling of a method with the number of electrons.

Let A and B be two non-interacting systems. If a given theory for the evaluation of the energy is size-consistent, then the energy of the supersystem A + B, separated by a sufficiently large distance such that there is essentially no shared electron density, is equal to the sum of the energy of A plus the energy of B taken by themselves: $E(A + B) = E(A) + E(B).$ This property of size consistency is of particular importance to obtain correctly behaving dissociation curves. Others have more recently argued that the entire potential energy surface should be well-defined.

Size consistency and size extensivity are sometimes used interchangeably in the literature. However, there are very important distinctions to be made between them. Hartree–Fock (HF), coupled cluster, many-body perturbation theory (to any order), and full configuration interaction (FCI) are size-extensive but not always size-consistent. For example, the restricted Hartree–Fock model is not able to correctly describe the dissociation curves of H_{2}, and therefore all post-HF methods that employ HF as a starting point will fail in that matter (so-called single-reference methods). Sometimes numerical errors can cause a method that is formally size-consistent to behave in a non-size-consistent manner.

Core extensivity is yet another related property, which extends the requirement to the proper treatment of excited states.
