= Configuration interaction =

Concept in computational chemistry

Configuration interaction (CI) is a post-Hartree–Fock linear variational method for solving the nonrelativistic Schrödinger equation within the Born–Oppenheimer approximation for a quantum chemical multi-electron system. Mathematically, configuration simply describes the linear combination of Slater determinants used for the wave function. In terms of a specification of orbital occupation (for instance, (1s)^{2}(2s)^{2}(2p)^{1}...), interaction means the mixing (interaction) of different electronic configurations (states). Due to the long CPU time and large memory required for CI calculations, the method is limited to relatively small systems.

In contrast to the Hartree–Fock method, in order to account for electron correlation, CI uses a variational wave function that is a linear combination of configuration state functions (CSFs) built from spin orbitals (denoted by the superscript SO),

$$\Psi = \sum_{I=0} c_{I} \Phi_{I}^{SO}  =  c_0\Phi_0^{SO} + c_1\Phi_1^{SO} + {...}$$

where Ψ is usually the electronic ground state of the system. If the expansion includes all possible CSFs of the appropriate symmetry, then this is a full configuration interaction procedure which exactly solves the electronic Schrödinger equation within the space spanned by the one-particle basis set. The first term in the above expansion is normally the Hartree–Fock determinant. The other CSFs can be characterised by the number of spin orbitals that are swapped with virtual orbitals from the Hartree–Fock determinant. If only one spin orbital differs, we describe this as a single excitation determinant. If two spin orbitals differ it is a double excitation determinant and so on. This is used to limit the number of determinants in the expansion which is called the CI-space.

Truncating the CI-space is important to save computational time. For example, the method CID is limited to double excitations only. The method CISD is limited to single and double excitations. Single excitations on their own do not mix with the Hartree–Fock determinant (see Brillouin's theorem). These methods, CID and CISD, are in many standard programs. The Davidson correction can be used to estimate a correction to the CISD energy to account for higher excitations. An important problem of truncated CI methods is their size-inconsistency which means the energy of two infinitely separated particles is not double the energy of the single particle.

The CI procedure leads to a general matrix eigenvalue equation:

$$\mathbb{H} \mathbf{c} = \mathbf{e}\mathbb{S}\mathbf{c},$$

where c is the coefficient vector, e is the eigenvalue matrix, and the elements of the hamiltonian and overlap matrices are, respectively,

$$\mathbb{H}_{ij} = \left\langle \Phi_i^{SO} | \mathbf{H}^{el} | \Phi_j^{SO} \right\rangle$$,

$$\mathbb{S}_{ij} = \left\langle \Phi_i^{SO} | \Phi_j^{SO} \right\rangle$$.

Slater determinants are constructed from sets of orthonormal spin orbitals, so that $\left\langle \Phi_i^{SO} | \Phi_j^{SO} \right\rangle = \delta_{ij}$, making $\mathbb{S}$ the identity matrix and simplifying the above matrix equation.

The solution of the CI procedure are some eigenvalues $\mathbf{E}^j$ and their corresponding eigenvectors $\mathbf{c}_I^j$.
The eigenvalues are the energies of the ground and some electronically excited states. By this it is possible to calculate energy differences (excitation energies) with CI methods. Excitation energies of truncated CI methods are generally too high, because the excited states are not that well correlated as the ground state is. For equally (balanced) correlation of ground and excited states (better excitation energies) one can use more than one reference determinant from which all singly, doubly, ... excited determinants are included (multireference configuration interaction). MRCI also gives better correlation of the ground state which is important if it has more than one dominant determinant. This can be easily understood because some higher excited determinants are also taken into the CI-space.
For nearly degenerate determinants which build the ground state one should use the multi-configurational self-consistent field (MCSCF) method because the Hartree–Fock determinant is qualitatively wrong and so are the CI wave functions and energies.

== See also ==
- Coupled cluster
- Electron correlation
- Multireference configuration interaction (MRCI)
- Multi-configurational self-consistent field (MCSCF)
- Post-Hartree–Fock
- Quadratic configuration interaction (QCI)
- Quantum chemistry
- Quantum chemistry computer programs
