= Multireference configuration interaction =

In quantum chemistry, the multireference configuration interaction (MRCI) method consists of a configuration interaction expansion of the eigenstates of the electronic molecular Hamiltonian in a set of Slater determinants which correspond to excitations of the ground state electronic configuration but also of some excited states. The Slater determinants from which the excitations are performed are called reference determinants. The higher excited determinants (also called configuration state functions (CSFs) or shortly configurations) are then chosen either by the program according to some perturbation theoretical ansatz according to a threshold provided by the user or simply by truncating excitations from these references to singly, doubly, ... excitations resulting in MRCIS, MRCISD, etc.

For the ground state using more than one reference configuration means a better correlation and so a lower energy. The problem of size inconsistency of truncated CI-methods is not solved by taking more references.

As a result of a MRCI calculation one gets a more balanced correlation of the ground and excited states. For quantitative good energy differences (excitation energies) one has to be careful in selecting the references. Taking only the dominant configuration of an excited state into the reference space leads to a correlated (lower) energy of the excited state. The generally too-high excitation energies of CIS or CISD are lowered. But usually excited states have more than one dominant configuration and so the ground state is more correlated due to: a) now including some configurations with higher excitations (triply and quadruply in MRCISD); b) the neglect of other dominant configurations of the excited states which are still uncorrelated.

Selecting the references can be done manually ($\Phi_1, \Phi_2, \Phi_5, ...$), automatically (all possible configurations within an active space of some orbitals) or semiautomatically (taking all configurations as references that have been shown to be important in a previous CI or MRCI calculation)

This method has been implemented first by Robert Buenker and Sigrid D. Peyerimhoff in the seventies under the name Multi-Reference Single and Double Configuration Interaction (MRSDCI). MRCI was further streamlined in 1988 by Hans-Joachim Werner and Peter Knowles, which made previous MRCI procedures more generalizable.

The MRCI method can also be implemented in semi-empirical methods. An example for this is the OM2/MRCI method developed by Walter Thiel's group.

== See also ==
- Configuration interaction
