= PQS (software) =

Quantum chemistry software program

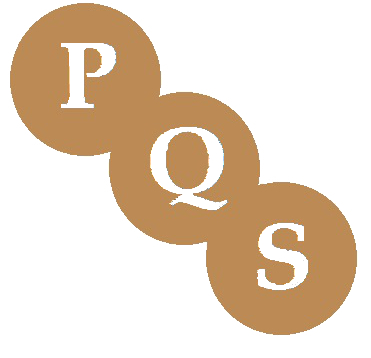
- Developer(s): Parallel Quantum Solutions
- Stable release: PQS ab initio v. 4.0
- Operating system: Linux, Microsoft Windows, Mac OS
- License: Commercial
- Website: www.pqs-chem.com

PQS is a general purpose quantum chemistry program. Its roots go back to the first ab initio gradient program developed in Professor Peter Pulay's group but now it is developed and distributed commercially by Parallel Quantum Solutions. There is a reduction in cost for academic users and a site license. Its strong points are geometry optimization, NMR chemical shift calculations, and large MP2 calculations, and high parallel efficiency on computing clusters. It includes many other capabilities including Density functional theory, the semiempirical methods, MINDO/3, MNDO, AM1 and PM3, Molecular mechanics using the SYBYL 5.0 Force Field, the quantum mechanics/molecular mechanics mixed method using the ONIOM method, natural bond orbital (NBO) analysis and COSMO solvation models. Recently, a highly efficient parallel CCSD(T) code for closed shell systems has been developed. This code includes many other post Hartree–Fock methods: MP2, MP3, MP4, CISD, CEPA, QCISD and so on.

== History ==
The origin of PQS program was developed by Meyer and Pulay in the late 1960s. They both were at the Max-Planck Institute for Physics and Astrophysics in Munich when they began to write a new ab initio program. The main purpose was to establish new ab initio techniques. Pulay and Meyer had slightly different interests. Pulay was interested in implementing gradient geometry optimization, analytical energy derivatives (force), and force constant calculations via the numerical differentiation of analytical forces, while Meyer enthused about the coupled-electron pair approximation (CEPA), spin density calculation, and extremely accurate correlation methods like pseudonatural orbital-configuration interaction (PNO-CI). At that time, analytical gradients were limited to closed-shell Hartree-Fock wavefunctions. However, they were able to do it for unrestricted (UHF) and restricted open-shell (ROHF) methods in 1970. The first version of the code was completed in 1969 at Max-Planck institute and University of Stuttgart. Then, Meyer named it “MOLPRO” and used Gaussian lobe basis sets. In the 1970s, the current version of MOLPRO added a number of advanced methods such as multiconfiguration self-consistent field (MC-SCF) and internally contracted multireference configuration interaction (MR-CI). Simultaneously, in the 1980s, MOLPRO was extended and mostly rewritten by Hans-Joachim Werner, Peter Knowles and Meyer's coworkers.

Meanwhile, in 1976, Pulay was visiting Boggs at the University of Texas, Austin and Schaefer at the University of California. They wrote a new program called TEXAS based on the original MOLPRO and replaced Gaussian lobe functions with the standard Gaussian functions. TEXAS emphasized large molecules, SCF convergence, geometry optimization techniques, and vibrational spectroscopy-related calculations. From 1982 onward, the program was further developed at the University of Arkansas.

The primary significant expansion was the usage of a few new electron correlation methods by Saebo and a first- order MC-SCF program by Hamilton. A critical option was the implementation of the first practical gauge-invariant atomic orbital (GIAO) NMR program by Wolinski, who additionally included a highly efficient integral package. Bofill executed an unhindered natural orbital-complete active space (UNO-CAS) program including analytical gradients; this is a minimal-cost alternative to MC-SCF and works just as well in most cases. TEXAS was initially parallelized in 1995–1996 on a cluster of 10 IBM RS6000 workstations.

In 1996, Baker joined Pulay and, around the same time, Intel brought out the Pentium Pro, a processor for PC that was competitive with low-end workstations and less costly by around an order of magnitude. Understanding the capability of this improvement for computational chemistry, PQS was formed and a SBIR grant application was submitted in July 1997 for the commercial development of PC clusters for parallel ab initio calculations. In the meantime, the Pulay group, financed by a National Science Foundation grant, set about constructing a Linux cluster using 300 MHz Pentium II processors. By a fortunate circumstance, a few capable and PC proficient graduate students were available, specifically Magyarfalvi and Shirel. The PC cluster was a complete success, and significantly outperformed the IBM Workstation cluster that was the group's computational mainstay at a small amount of its expense.

The PQS programming was demonstrated on the TEXAS code and parts of it, chiefly the NMR code, were authorized to PQS from the University of Arkansas. Much of the code was widely changed to comply with the twin points of (a) having all major functionality fully parallel; and (b) having the capacity to routinely perform calculations on extensive systems. They aimed primarily for a modest level of parallelism (from 8 to 32 CPUs), as this is the most widely recognized size for an individual or group resource. Indeed, even on very large clusters it is normal for any given user to be allocated only a percentage of the available processors.

== Features ==
The basis capabilities in high-level correlated energies for PQS ab initio v. 4.0 include MP3, MP4, CID, CISD, CEPA-0, CEPA-2, QCISD, QCISD(T), CCD, CCSD and CCSD(T) wavefunctions; enforced geometry optimization (used, among other things, to simulate the results of Atomic Force Microscopy (AFM) experiments); full-accuracy, canonical UMP2 energies and analytical polarizabilities and hyperpolarizabilities for HF and DFT wavefunctions.

- An efficient vectorized Gaussian integral package allowing high angular momentum basis functions and general contractions.
- Abelian point group symmetry throughout; utilizes full point group symmetry (up to Ih) for geometry optimization step and Hessian (2nd derivative) CPHF.
- Closed-shell (RHF) and open-shell (UHF) SCF energies and gradients, including several initial wavefunction guess options. Improved SCF convergence for open-shell systems.
- Closed-shell (RHF) and open-shell (UHF) density functional energies and gradients including all popular exchange-correlation functionals: VWN, B88, OPTX, LYP, P86, PW91, PBE, B97, HCTH, B3LYP, make up your own functional etc.
- Fast and accurate pure DFT energies and gradients for large basis sets using the Fourier Transform Coulomb (FTC) method.
- Productive, adaptable geometry optimization for every one of these methods including Eigenvector Following (EF) algorithm for minimization and saddle-point search, Pulay's GDIIS algorithm for minimization, use of Cartesian, Z-matrix and delocalized internal coordinates. Includes new coordinates for efficient optimization of molecular clusters and adsorption/reaction on model surfaces.
- Full range of geometrical constraints including fixed distances, planar bends, torsions and out-of-plane bends between any atoms in the molecule and frozen (fixed) atoms. Atoms involved in constraints do not need to be formally bonded and - unlike with a Z matrix - desired constraints do not need to be satisfied in the starting geometry.
- Expository second subsidiaries for every one of these systems, including the calculation of vibrational frequencies, IR intensities and thermodynamic analysis.
- Efficient NMR Chemical Shifts for closed-shell HF and DFT wavefunctions.
- A full range of effective core potentials (ECPs), both relativistic and non-relativistic, with energies, gradients, analytical second derivatives and NMR.
- Closed-shell MP2 energies and analytical gradients and dual-basis MP2 energies; numerical MP2 second derivatives.
- Potential scan, including scan + optimization of all other degrees of freedom.
- Reaction Path (IRC) following using either Z-matrix, Cartesian or mass-weighted Cartesian coordinates.
- Conductor-like screening solvation model (COSMO) including energies, analytical gradients, numerical second derivatives and NMR.
- Population analysis, including bond orders and atomic valencies (with free valencies for open-shell systems); CHELP and Cioslowski charges.
- Weinhold's Natural Bond Order (NBO) analysis, including natural population and steric analysis.
- Properties module with charge, spin-density and electric field gradient at the nucleus.
- Polarizabilities and dipole and polarizability derivatives; Raman intensities.
- Full Semiempirical package, both open (unrestricted) and closed-shell energies and gradients, including MINDO/3, MNDO, AM1 and PM3. For the latter, all main group elements through the fourth row (except the noble gases) as well as Zinc and Cadmium, have been parametrized.
- Molecular Mechanics using the Sybyl 5.2 and UFF Force Fields.
- QM/MM using the ONIOM method.
- Molecular dynamics using the simple Verlet algorithm.
- Pople-style input for quick input generation and compatibility with other programs.
- Graphical input generation and display
- All major ab initio functionality is fully parallel (except MP2 gradients which is serial only - parallel version under development).
- Calculate molecular structure and vibrational spectra for transition state, infrared (IR), Raman and Vibrational circular dichroism (VCD).

== See also ==
- Quantum chemistry computer programs
- ADF
- CHARMM
- CP2K
- GAMESS (US)
- GAMESS (UK)
- Gaussian (software)
- MOLCAS
- MOLPRO
- MPQC
- NWChem
- ORCA
- Psi3
- Firefly
- Quantemol
- Spartan
- TeraChem
- TURBOMOLE
