= MOLPRO =

Ab initio quantum chemistry software package

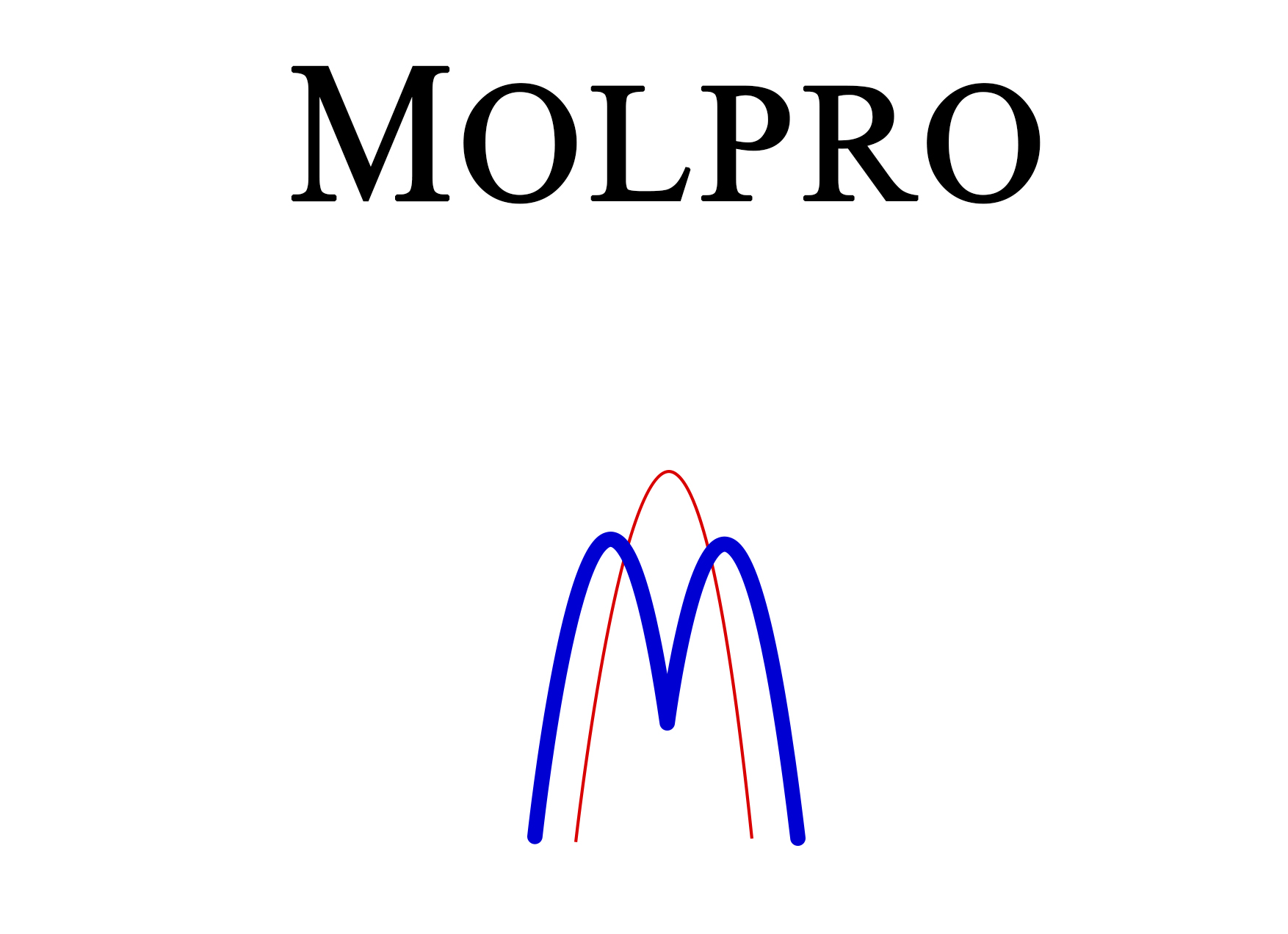
- Developers: H.-J. Werner and P. J. Knowles
- Stable release: 2025.2
- Operating system: Linux, macOS
- Type: Computational chemistry
- License: academic
- Website: www.molpro.net

MOLPRO is a software package used for accurate ab initio quantum chemistry calculations. It is developed by Peter Knowles at Cardiff University and Hans-Joachim Werner at Universität Stuttgart in collaboration with other authors.

The emphasis in the program is on highly accurate computations, with extensive treatment of the electron correlation problem through the multireference configuration interaction, coupled cluster and associated methods. Integral-direct local electron correlation methods reduce the increase of the computational cost with molecular size. Accurate ab initio calculations can then be performed for larger molecules. With new explicitly correlated methods the basis set limit can be very closely approached.

== History ==
Molpro was designed and maintained by Wilfried Meyer and Peter Pulay in the late 1960s. At that moment, Pulay developed the first analytical gradient code called Hartree-Fock (HF), and Meyer researched his PNO-CEPA (pseudo-natural orbital coupled-electron pair approximation) methods. In 1980, Werner and Meyer developed a new state-averaged, quadratically convergent (MC-SCF) method, which provided geometry optimization for multireference cases. By the same year, the first internally contracted multireference configuration interaction (IC-MRCI) program was developed by Werner and Reinsch. About four years later (1984), Werner and Knowles developed on a new generation program called CASSCF (complete active space SCF). This new CASSCF program combined fast orbital optimization algorithms with determinant-based full CI codes, and additional, more general, unitary group configuration interaction (CI) codes. This resulted in the quadratically convergent MCSCF/CASSCF code called MULTI, which allowed modals to be optimized a weighted energy average of several states, and is capable of treating both completely general configuration expansions. In fact, this method is still available today. In addition to these organizational developments, Knowles and Werner started to cooperate on a new, more efficient, IC-MRCI method. Extensions for accurate treatments of excited states became possible through a new IC-MRCI method. In brief, the present IC-MRCI will be described as MRCI. These recently developed MCSCF and MRCI methods resulted in the basis of the modern Molpro. In the following years, a number of new programs were added. Analytic energy gradients can be evaluated with coupled-cluster calculations, density functional theory (DFT), as well as many other programs.

== See also ==
- Quantemol Electron Collisions
- CP2K
- GAMESS
- Gaussian (software)
- MOLCAS
- MPQC
- NWChem
- PQS
- Psi4
- Q-Chem
- TeraChem
- TURBOMOLE
- Grace
- Global Arrays
- Quantum chemistry computer programs
- ORCA (quantum chemistry program)
