= Quantemol =

British software development company

Quantemol Ltd is based in University College London initiated by Professor Jonathan Tennyson FRS and Dr. Daniel Brown in 2004. The company initially developed a unique software tool, Quantemol-N, which provides full accessibility to the highly sophisticated UK molecular R-matrix codes, used to model electron polyatomic molecule interactions. Since then Quantemol has widened to further types of simulation, with plasmas and industrial plasma tools, in Quantemol-VT in 2013 and launched in 2016 a sustainable database Quantemol-DB, representing the chemical and radiative transport properties of a wide range of plasmas.

== Quantemol-N ==
The Quantemol-N software system has been developed to simplify use of UK R-matrix codes. It provides an interface for non specialists to perform ab initio electron-molecule scattering calculations. Quantemol-N calculates a variety of observables for electron molecule collisions including:

- Elastic cross sections
- Electronic excitation cross sections
- Electron impact dissociation rates
- Resonance parameters
- Radial charge density calculation
- Dissociative electron attachment cross sections
- Ionisation cross sections
- Differential cross sections
- Momentum transfer cross sections
- Vibrational excitation cross sections

=== Applicable simulations ===
Quantemol-N is capable of tackling a variety of problems;

- Closed shell molecules
- Open shell molecules, and radicals
- Neutral and positively charged species
- Molecules of up to 17 atoms. (Neopentane has been successfully simulated, with improvements allowing more atoms in the future, and rapid movement towards Biomolecules)

=== Accuracy ===
A study on the key benchmark molecule; water, gave results more accurate than obtainable experimentally (Faure et al. 2004).

Experimentally, there are problems measuring large cross sections at low angles; this applies to any molecule with a large dipole moment. Being a simulation, this is not a problem for Quantemol-N.

=== Relevant Publications ===
- Quantemol-N: an expert system for performing electron molecule collision calculations using the R-matrix method

Jonathan Tennyson, Daniel B. Brown, James J. Munro, Iryna Rozum, Hemal N. Varambhia and Natalia Vinci
Journal of Physics: Conference Series 86, 012001 (2007)
doi: 1742-6596/86/1/012001

- Calculations of Cross Sections Data for Scattering of Electrons on HBr

Radmilovic-Radjenovic M., Petrovic Z.L.,
Acta Physica Polonica A, 117 (2010),745-747

- Electron-impact rotational excitation of the carbon monosulphide (CS) molecule

Varambhia H. N., Faure A., Graupner K., et al.
Monthly Notices of the Royal Astronomical Society, 403 (2010), 1409-1412

- Cross-sections for the scattering of electrons with BF_{3}

M. Radmilovic-Radjenovic, H. N. Varambhia, M. Vranic, J. Tennyson, Z. Lj. Petrovic.
Publ. Astron. Obs. Belgrade No. 84 (2008), 57-60

- R-matrix calculations of low-energy electron alkane collisions

Hemal N. Varambhia, James J. Munro and Jonathan Tennyson
International Journal of Mass Spectrometry, 271, 1-7 (2008)

- Electron collision with the HCN and HNC molecules using the R-matrix method

Hemal N. Varambhia and Jonathan Tennyson
Journal of Physics B: Atomic, Molecular and Optical Physics, 40, 1211-1223 (2007)

- Tool opens door to quantum modelling

29 March 2005, by Harry Yeates, Electronics Weekly

- Quantemol-N from plasma etch and lasers to earth's ionosphere

15 March 2005, III-Vs Review

== Quantemol-EC ==
Quantemol-Electron Collisions is a python-based software enabling calculations of electron-molecule scattering cross sections using a suite of up to date R-matrix codes (UKRMol+) and other methods such as Binary Encounter Bethe (BEB) model, BEf- scaling and dissociative electron attachment cross-section estimation. It was launched in 2019 and its major differences from Quantemol-N are the use of UKRMol+ instead of UKRMol and utilising Molpro software for molecular target setups. These changes resulted in higher accuracy of calculations and improved usability as molecular geometry optimisation/generation and symmetry identification is performed by Molpro.

Quantemol-EC calculates a variety of observables for electron molecule collisions including:

- Elastic cross sections
- Electronic excitation cross sections
- Super-elastic/Quenching/De-excitation cross sections
- Electron impact dissociation (subject to a target molecule's specifics)
- Scattering reaction rate
- Arrhenius parameters for reaction rates
- Resonance parameters
- Estimate dissociative electron attachment
- Differential cross sections
- Momentum transfer cross sections
- Electron impact ionisation at all energies
- Rotational excitation cross sections

=== Applicable simulations ===
In the same way as Quantemol-N, Quantemol-EC can be used for closed-shell and open-shell molecules, radicals, neutral and positively charged species.

=== Relevant Publications ===
- Cooper, Bridgette; Tudorovskaya, Maria; Mohr, Sebastian; o'Hare, Aran; Hanicinec, Martin; Dzarasova, Anna; Gorfinkiel, Jimena; Benda, Jakub; Mašín, Zdeněk; Al-Refaie, Ahmed; Knowles, Peter; Tennyson, Jonathan (2019). "Quantemol Electron Collisions (QEC): An Enhanced Expert System for Performing Electron Molecule Collision Calculations Using the R-Matrix Method". Atoms. 7 (4): 97. Bibcode:2019Atoms...7...97C. doi:10.3390/atoms7040097.
- Mašín, Zdeněk; Benda, Jakub; Gorfinkiel, Jimena D.; Harvey, Alex G.; Tennyson, Jonathan (2020). "UKRmol+: A suite for modelling electronic processes in molecules interacting with electrons, positrons and photons using the R-matrix method". Computer Physics Communications. 249 107092. arXiv:1908.03018. Bibcode:2020CoPhC.24907092M. doi:10.1016/j.cpc.2019.107092. S2CID 199511040.
- Werner, Hans-Joachim; Knowles, Peter J.; Knizia, Gerald; Manby, Frederick R.; Schütz, Martin (2012). "Molpro: A general-purpose quantum chemistry program package". Wiley Interdisciplinary Reviews: Computational Molecular Science. 2 (2): 242–253. doi:10.1002/wcms.82. S2CID 94868368.
- Tennyson, Jonathan (2010). "Electron–molecule collision calculations using the R-matrix method". Physics Reports. 491 (2–3): 29–76. Bibcode:2010PhR...491...29T. doi:10.1016/j.physrep.2010.02.001.

For resonance fits:

- Tennyson, Jonathan; Noble, Cliff J. (1984). "RESON—A program for the detection and fitting of Breit-Wigner resonances". Computer Physics Communications. 33 (4): 421–424. Bibcode:1984CoPhC..33..421T. doi:10.1016/0010-4655(84)90147-4.

For calculating electron attachment:

- Munro, James J.; Harrison, Stephen; Fujimoto, Milton M.; Tennyson, Jonathan (2012). "A dissociative electron attachment cross-section estimator". Journal of Physics: Conference Series. 388 (1) 012013. Bibcode:2012JPhCS.388a2013M. doi:10.1088/1742-6596/388/1/012013. S2CID 6265873.

For calculating Binary Encounter Bethe (BEB) model:

- Kim, Yong-Ki; Rudd, M. Eugene (1994). "Binary-encounter-dipole model for electron-impact ionization". Physical Review A. 50 (5): 3954–3967. Bibcode:1994PhRvA..50.3954K. doi:10.1103/physreva.50.3954. PMID 9911367.

For calculating BE-f Scaling:

- Kim, Yong-Ki (2001). "Scaling of plane-wave Born cross sections for electron-impact excitation of neutral atoms". Physical Review A. 64 (3) 032713. Bibcode:2001PhRvA..64c2713K. doi:10.1103/physreva.64.032713.

== Quantemol-VT ==
Quantemol-Virtual Tool is an expert software system for the simulation of industrial plasma processing tools. Q-VT builds upon the comprehensively validated Hybrid Plasma Equipment Model (HPEM) codes developed by renowned plasma physicist Professor Mark Kushner for simulating non-equilibrium low pressure (up to 1 Torr) plasma processes. Q-VT includes an intuitive user interface, data visualisation and analysis capabilities, and convenient job/batch management.

Applications include:

- Tool design and development
- Modelling of discharge and wafer level chemistry kinetics
- Model etch/deposition uniformity
- Examine tilting effects (when used with additional feature scale profile model, specifically compatible with Synopsys software)
- Large wafer size simulation (12 inch and more)

What Q-VT can model:

- Plasma tool geometry alterations
- Advanced volume and surface chemistries
- Variation of key plasma state variables with process parameter changes
- Ion flux on wafer level: ion energy/ angular distribution functions, and fluxes of all species along the wafer
- Non-Maxwellian electron dynamics
- Complex electromagnetic plasma interactions (current coils, permanent magnets, multi-frequency power supply, plasma circuit interactions)

Benefits of Q-VT

- Experimentally validated simulation system
- Experimentally validated simulation system focused on modelling plasma tools
- User-friendly tool-like interface
- Sets of validated plasma chemistries and cross-sections are provided with the licence
- Example libraries include numerous chambers
- Easy-to-use drawing tool for chamber design and modification: a tool simulation set-up service can be provided
- Ability to model complex plasma phenomena with additional modules (dust/radiation transport, ion kinetics, external circuits, etc.)
- Multi-run management system for managing large numbers of simulations
- Advanced reactor scale visualisation of scalar and vector plasma properties
- Experimental results importing
- Ability to easily distribute and manage jobs over a cluster

== Quantemol-DB ==
The Quantemol database (QDB or Quantemol-DB) is a database of plasma processes developed by Quantemol Ltd at University College London in 2016. The database contains chemistry data for plasma chemistry modelling with pre-assembled and validated chemistry sets, and is updated by Quantemol and contributing users. A peer-reviewed article detailing the database and service was published in 2017. One of the most challenging aspects in plasma modelling is insufficient chemistry data. The purpose of QDB is to provide a forum for collaborative effort between academia and industrial research to access, compare and improve the understanding of plasma chemistry sets influencing plasma behaviour.

=== Approach to validation ===
The principles established for the validation of chemistry sets are that:

1. There is experimental bench-marking from open sources (where available) and also directly provided by industrial partners (collaborating on the Powerbase project) and database contributors.
2. Calculations are performed for a range of models thereby reflecting the underlying quality of input data (example models used for validation include HPEM, Global_Kin, ChemKin).
3. The models used to produce the data are validated on a case-by-case basis.
4. Numerical uncertainties are quantified with thresholds set for validation where possible.

This methodology is specifically applied to atomic and molecular calculations using the principles established in the publication "Uncertainty Estimates of Theoretical Atomic and Molecular Data", which was produced for the International Atomic Energy Agency and focused on "data that are most important for high-temperature plasma modeling" with the "ultimate goal to develop guidelines for self-validation of computational theory for A+M [Atomic and Molecular] processes".

It is recognised that while the validation of chemistry sets directly may still be uncertain, the validation of data produced by models using this data will often be more easily obtained.

QDB users are invited to validate chemistry sets either directly or by validating the results of models which use these chemistry sets as inputs. Validation of the chemistry sets provided in the database will be based on the foundations of Uncertainty Quantification for calculations of complex systems.

For chemistry simulation, the scaling law based on the parameter study is a common methodology for this validation. For higher dimensional simulation, the behaviour of the species and the surface will be used for comparison.

Referencing is provided for users downloading chemistry sets, to ensure that relevant citations to chemistry set and validating experiments are included and can be used for publications.

=== Validation of Individual Chemistry Reactions ===
Rate coefficients of each reaction are included in the validated chemistry set for a similar range of temperature and pressure.

The main validation method for individual reactions is compared with alternative theoretical calculations/estimations and experimental measurements. For unknown reactions different calculation methods are used:

- Quantemol-N (R-matrix method) calculations for electron molecule scattering reactions
- Scaling law, mathematical methods of estimation and expert opinion to estimate necessary data
- Quantum and Transition State Theory for unknown heavy particle reactions

=== API feature ===
The Application Programming Interface (API) is a set of protocols and tools for linking the database with plasma modelling software Quantemol-VT. An API specifies how software components should interact and APIs are used when chemistries can be accessible in the graphical user interface (GUI) of the plasma modelling software.

=== Surface Processes ===
The database has a library of sticking coefficients for atomic oxygen, atomic fluorine, fluorocarbons, and silane radicals. For surface mechanisms such as specific etches, the database provides a set of individual reactions with their associated probabilities. For energy-dependent reactions, the formula and the value of the used parameters are provided.

=== Dynamic Chemistry app ===
This application helps to gather data which is already in Quantemol-DB related to feedstock gases of the plasma and assemble a new chemistry set and preferred format for downloading or running a Global Model or Boltzmann Solver.

=== Global Model ===
The online global model calculates the reactor averaged particle densities and the electron temperature for a given set of process parameters in plasma. The model is solving equations: Particle density balance for heavy species Charge neutrality Electron energy density balance

The output includes volume average densities of species and electron temperature. Calculations can be set up for both pre-assembled and self-generated chemistry sets using the Dynamic Chemistry app.

Detailed documentation can be found here.

=== Boltzmann Solver ===
The Boltzmann Solver is based on the formalism described in S. D. Rockwood, "Elastic and Inelastic Cross Sections for Electron-Hg Scattering from Hg Transport Data", Physical Review A 8, 2348-2358 (1973) and it was extended to a non-uniform energy grid.

The solver calculates EEDFs, effective electron temperature, and rate coefficients for electron collisions in the chemistry set for a gas temperature of choice, suitable for discharges with non-Maxwellian distributions.

Calculations can be set up for both pre-assembled and self-generated chemistry sets using the Dynamic Chemistry app.

=== Current chemistry sets ===
N_{2}/H_{2}	CF_{4}/O_{2}	CH_{4}/H_{2}	Ar/NF_{3}/O_{2}
He	O_{2}	Ar	N_{2}
Ar/H_{2}	SiH_{4}/NH_{3}	Ar/O_{2}	CF_{4}/H_{2}
Ar/Cu	CF_{4}	Ar/NH_{3}	SiH_{4}/Ar/O_{2}
SF_{6}	SiH_{4}	Cl_{2}/O_{2}/Ar	He/O_{2}
C_{2}H_{2}/H_{2}	Ar/BCl_{3}/Cl_{2}	C_{4}F_{8}	CH_{4}/NH_{3}
N_{2}/H_{2}/O_{2}/CF_{4}	CH_{4}/N_{2}	HBr/CF_{4}/CHF_{3}/H_{2}/Cl_{2}O_{2}	C_{2}H_{2}/NH_{3}
SF_{6}/CF_{4}/O_{2}	Ar/O_{2}/C_{4}F_{8}	Ar/Cu/He	O_{2}/H_{2}
Ar/NF_{3}	SF_{6}/O_{2}	H_{2}	SF_{6}/CF_{4}/N_{2}/H_{2}

== See also ==
- CP2K
- GAMESS
- Gaussian
- MOLCAS
- MPQC
- NWChem
- PQS
- Psi3
- Q-Chem
- TURBOMOLE
- Grace
- Global Arrays
- Quantum chemistry computer programs
