= SAM1 =

SAM1, or "Semiempirical ab initio Model 1", is a semiempirical quantum chemistry method for computing molecular properties. It is an implementation the general Neglect of Differential Diatomic Overlap (NDDO) integral approximation, and is efficient and accurate. Related methods are AM1, PM3 and the older MNDO.

SAM1 was developed by M.J.S. Dewar and co-workers at the University of Texas and the University of Florida. Papers describing the implementation of the method and its results were published in 1993 and 1994. The method is implemented in the AMPAC program produced by Semichem

SAM1 builds on the success of the Dewar-style semiempirical models by adding two new aspects to the AM1/PM3 formalism:

1. Two-electron repulsion integrals (TERIs) are computed from a minimal basis set of contracted Gaussian functions, as opposed to the previously used multipole expansion. Note that the NDDO approximation is still in effect, and that only a few of the possible TERIs are explicitly computed. The values of the explicit TERIs are scaled using empirically-derived functions to obtain experimentally relevant results.
2. One-center two-electron repulsion integrals (OCTEs) are derived initially to reproduce atomic properties. These values are then fixed and carried forward as further elemental parameterization proceeds.

The performance of SAM1 for C, H, O, N, F, Cl, Br, and I was claimed to be superior to other semiempirical methods. Especially noteworthy were the smaller systematic errors for heats for formation.

.

== See also ==
- Semi-empirical quantum chemistry method
- NDDO
