= PM3 =

PM3 or PM-3 may be:

- Pm3 (dentistry), dental nomenclature for premolar tooth
- PM3 (chemistry), Computational chemistry
- Paper Mario 3, a 2007 Wii game
- Pm3̅, three-dimensional space group number 200
