= Unhook the Stars =

1996 film by Nick Cassavetes

- Theatrical release poster
- Directed by: Nick Cassavetes
- Written by: Helen Caldwell; Nick Cassavetes
- Produced by: René Cleitman; Gérard Depardieu; Panos Nicolaou
- Starring: Gena Rowlands; Marisa Tomei; Gérard Depardieu; Jake Lloyd; David Sherrill; David Thornton; Bridgette Wilson; Moira Kelly
- Cinematography: Phedon Papamichael Jr.
- Edited by: Petra von Oelffen
- Music by: Steven Hufsteter
- Distributed by: Miramax Films
- Release dates: November 1, 1996 (US; limited)
- Running time: 103 minutes
- Countries: France; United States
- Language: English
- Box office: $272,542

Unhook the Stars is a 1996 drama film directed by Nick Cassavetes, and starring his mother Gena Rowlands, Marisa Tomei, Gérard Depardieu, Jake Lloyd in his film debut, David Sherrill, David Thornton, Bridgette Wilson and Moira Kelly.

Rowlands plays Mildred, a widow who befriends the wayward Monica (Tomei), a single mother from across the street, and eventually finds herself babysitter of Monica's young son, J.J. (Lloyd) Throughout the film, Monica and J.J. inadvertently teach Mildred valuable life lessons about herself and her relationships with others.

Rowlands and Tomei both received SAG Award nominations for their performances. The film's title refers to a song of the same name by Cyndi Lauper, which can be heard over the closing credits.

== Plot ==
Mildred is a widow living with her rebellious, irresponsible twentysomething daughter Annie in Salt Lake City. One day after a fight, Annie goes to live as a vagrant with her boyfriend, leaving Mildred alone for the first time in her life. Her wayward neighbor Monica knocks on Mildred's door, begging her to watch her young son J.J. so she can go to her work shift. Monica has kicked her abusive husband Frankie out of their house.

Mildred agrees to watch J.J., and offers to babysit and take him to school whenever Monica needs her to. Establishing a close relationship with J.J. and Monica, he eventually comes to refer to her as "Auntie Mildred." Mildred reads to him, takes him to the park, and educates him on history by reading from her encyclopedias. At Thanksgiving, Mildred invites Monica and J.J. over for dinner as well as her yuppie son Ethan and his wife Jeannie. Jeannie is perturbed by Monica's brash behavior and cursing, though Ethan and Mildred seem disaffected by her personality. Ethan suggests that Mildred should move to San Francisco with him and Jeannie.

Mildred spends Christmas with Monica and J.J., and babysits him on New Year's Eve. On Valentine's Day, Frankie comes to Monica's in the middle of the night, begging to reunite with her. She quietly listens to his pleas, but does not open the door. Monica gets a babysitter for J.J. so she can go out for a night with Mildred, taking her to a local pub where she introduces her to her friend Big Tommy, a truck driver who expresses interest in Mildred. Monica leaves the bar without telling Mildred, so Big Tommy gives Mildred a ride home.

Mildred goes to visit Ethan and Jeannie in San Francisco, where he invites her to live on the top floor of their luxurious house overlooking the Bay Area, and reveals that Jeannie is pregnant. She ultimately refuses Ethan's offer, enraging him. Mildred returns home to find that Monica and Frankie have reconciled, and J.J. begins spending more time with his father, leaving Mildred depressed and alone.

One night, Mildred returns home to find Annie there. She asks if she could return home, saying that she now has a job and is applying to college. However, Mildred tells her that she has sold the house, and has to be out by the end of the month. Mildred goes on a date with Tommy, and confesses she doesn't know where she's moving to.

While Monica helps Mildred pack her house, she tells her how much Frankie has improved as a husband, but senses Mildred's distance. Frankie brings J.J. over, and he asks to talk to Mildred in private. J.J. gives her a drawing and thanks her for taking care of him, and the three say their goodbyes. Annie drives Mildred to the airport, though Mildred refuses to tell her where she's going, saying it's a secret.

== Cast ==
- Gena Rowlands as Mildred
- Marisa Tomei as Monica
- Gérard Depardieu as Big Tommy
- Jake Lloyd as J.J.
- David Sherrill as Ethan
- David Thornton as Frankie
- Bridgette Wilson as Jeannie
- Bobby Cooper as Bernt
- Clint Howard as Gus
- Moira Kelly as Ann Mary Margaret

== Production ==
Parts of the film were shot in Salt Lake City, Utah.

The film was co-produced by the French company HPGD, a subsidiary of Hachette group created in association with actor Gérard Depardieu. After developing a passion for the films directed by John Cassavetes, Depardieu had bought the distribution rights for most of them, to introduce them to a new audience in France. Having befriended the Cassavetes family, he decided to support Nick Cassavetes' directorial debut by producing and appearing in his film.

== Release ==
Unhook the Stars was released theatrically in the United States on November 1, 1996 in a limited release in New York City. The film grossed a total of $272,542USD playing on three screens. The film later received a wider release on Valentine's Day 1997.

=== Home media ===
In 1997, the film was released on VHS by Buena Vista Home Entertainment (under the Miramax Home Entertainment banner). It also received a U.S. LaserDisc release on June 11, 1997, with a Hong Kong LaserDisc having earlier been released on March 19, 1997. Buena Vista Home Entertainment/Miramax Home Entertainment released the film on DVD in the U.S. on October 8, 2002.

In December 2010, Miramax was sold by The Walt Disney Company, their owners since 1993. That same month, the studio was taken over by private equity firm Filmyard Holdings. Filmyard licensed the home video rights for several Miramax titles to Echo Bridge Entertainment, and in 2012, Echo Bridge reissued Unhook the Stars on DVD. In 2011, Filmyard Holdings licensed the Miramax library to streamer Netflix. This deal included Unhook the Stars, and ran for five years, eventually ending on June 1, 2016.

Filmyard Holdings sold Miramax to Qatari company beIN Media Group during March 2016. In April 2020, ViacomCBS (now known as Paramount Skydance) acquired the rights to Miramax's library, after buying a 49% stake in the studio from beIN. Unhook the Stars was one of the 700 titles they acquired in the deal, and since April 2020, the film has been distributed by Paramount Pictures. The film was later made available on Paramount's free streaming service Pluto TV.

== Reception ==
Unhook the Stars received generally positive critical reaction.

On the review aggregator website Rotten Tomatoes, 82% of 22 critics' reviews are positive, with an average rating of 6.5/10.

=== Critical response ===
Roger Ebert of the Chicago Sun-Times gave the film three out of four stars, calling it "a film of gentleness and low-key romance," and praised Rowlands' performance. Lisa Schwarzbaum of Entertainment Weekly gave the film a B− rating, also praising the film's performances.

Stephen Holden of The New York Times also praised the performances in the film, but gave an ambivalent review, stating: "The impressive acting can cover up only so many glaring holes in a film that doesn't really know what it wants to say. Unhook the Stars isn't a story that had to be told but a sentimental contrivance constructed around its star." Emanuel Levy of Variety wrote: "Production designer Phedon Papamichael Sr. (who worked extensively with Cassavetes pere), lenser Phedon Papamichael, editor Petra Von Oelffen and the rest of the crew have contributed to the making of a handsome, extremely enjoyable film."
