= MOPAC =

Computational chemistry software package

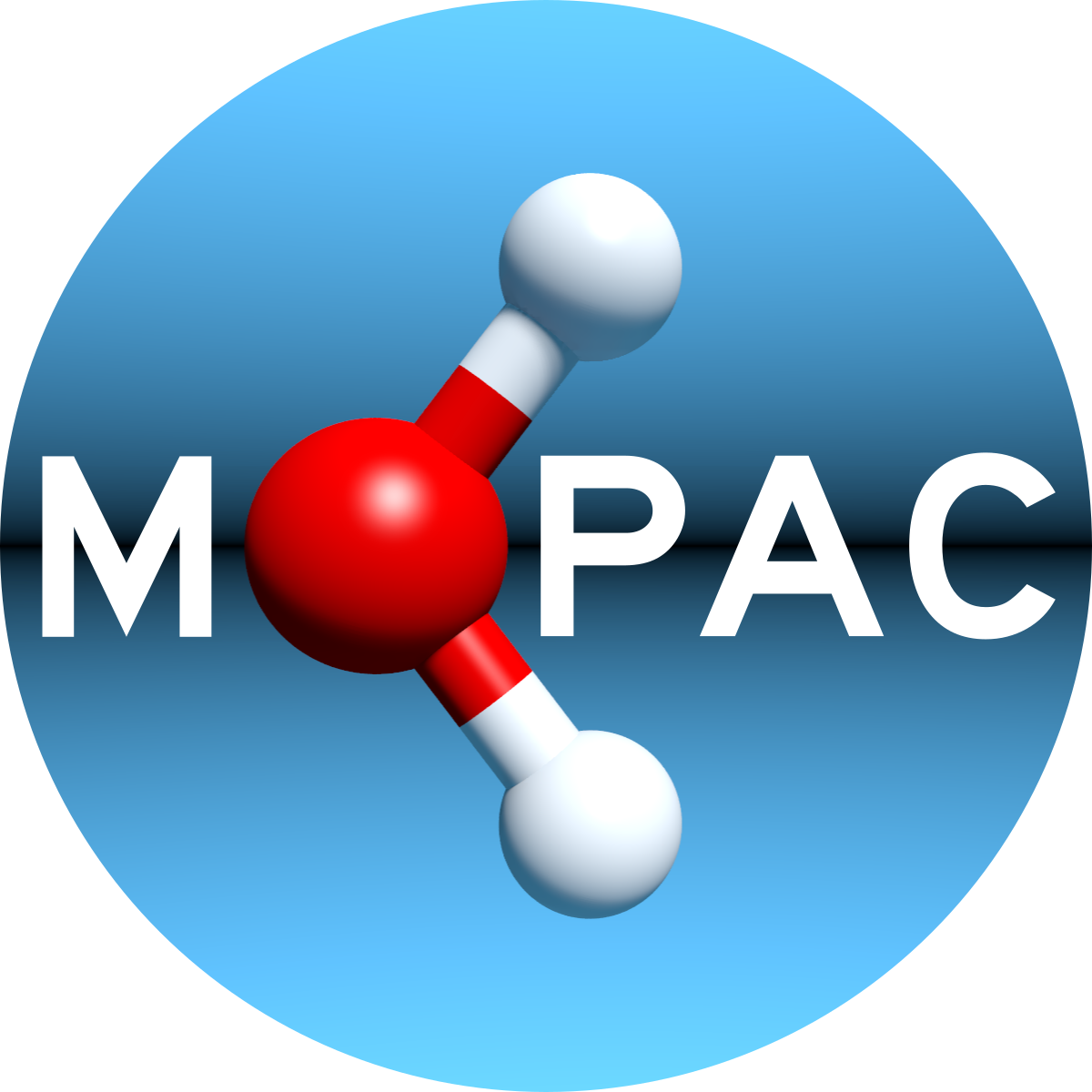
- Original author: James Stewart
- Developer: Molecular Sciences Software Institute
- Release: 1983; 43 years ago
- Stable release: 23.2.5 / 3 May 2026; 5 months ago
- Written in: Fortran
- Operating system: Linux, MacOS, Microsoft Windows
- Available in: English
- Type: Computational chemistry
- License: Apache 2.0
- Website: openmopac.net
- Repository: github.com/openmopac/mopac

MOPAC is a computational chemistry software package that implements a variety of semi-empirical quantum chemistry methods based on the neglect of diatomic differential overlap (NDDO) approximation and fit primarily for gas-phase thermochemistry. Modern versions of MOPAC support 83 elements of the periodic table (H-La, Lu-Bi as atoms, Ce-Yb as ionic sparkles) and have expanded functionality for solvated molecules, crystalline solids, and proteins. MOPAC was originally developed in Michael Dewar's research group in the early 1980s and released as public domain software on the Quantum Chemistry Program Exchange in 1983. It became commercial software in 1993, developed and distributed by Fujitsu, and Stewart Computational Chemistry took over commercial development and distribution in 2007. In 2022, it was released as open-source software on GitHub.

== Functionality ==
MOPAC is primarily a serial command-line program. Its default behavior is to take a molecular geometry specified by an input file and perform a local optimization of the geometry to minimize the heat of formation of the molecule. The details of this process are then summarized by an output file. The behavior of MOPAC can be modified by specifying keywords on the first line of the input file, and translation vectors can be added to the geometry to specify a polymer, surface, or crystal.

MOPAC is compatible with other software to provide graphical user interfaces (GUIs), visualization of outputs, and processing of inputs. The most well-known GUIs that support MOPAC are Chem3D, WebMO, the Amsterdam Modeling Suite, and the Molecular Operating Environment. Jmol can visualize some MOPAC outputs such as molecular orbitals and partial charges. ECCE builds MOPAC input, runs MOPAC jobs on the local computer or on remote machines, and displays the results. Open Babel supports conversion to and from MOPAC's input file format.

== Major features ==
- Semiempirical models: AM1, PM3, PM6, PM7
- Geometry optimization
- Transition-state optimization
- Vibrational analysis
- COSMO solvation model
- Periodic boundary conditions (Gamma point only, no Brillouin zone sampling)
- MOZYME for closed-shell systems (linear-scaling electronic structure algorithm)
- Gas-phase thermodynamics
- Molecular polarizability
- Automatic hydrogenation for pre-processing of Protein Data Bank structures
- INDO spectroscopy
- Configuration interaction
- PARAM, a companion program for parameter optimization

== History ==
MOPAC was originally developed in Michael Dewar's research group at the University of Texas at Austin to consolidate their previous developments of MINDO/3 and MNDO models and software and to serve as the software implementation of the AM1 model. The name MOPAC was both an acronym for Molecular Orbital PACkage and a reference to the Mopac Expressway that runs alongside parts of the UT Austin campus. The first version of MOPAC was deposited in the Quantum Chemistry Program Exchange (QCPE) in 1983 as QCPE Program #455 with James Stewart as its primary author. James Stewart joined the Dewar group in 1980 as a visiting professor on leave from the University of Strathclyde, and he continued the development of MOPAC after moving to the United States Air Force Academy in 1984. In 1993, MOPAC was acquired by Fujitsu and sold as commercial software, while James Stewart continued its development as a consultant. After 2007, new versions of MOPAC were developed and sold by Stewart Computational Chemistry with support from the Small Business Innovation Research program. Concurrent with its commercial development, there was an effort to continue development of the last pre-commercial version of MOPAC as an open-source software project. In 2022, the commercial development and distribution of MOPAC ended, and it was officially re-released as an open-source software project on GitHub developed by the Molecular Sciences Software Institute.

Early versions of MOPAC distributed by the QCPE were considered to be in the public domain and were forked into several other notable software projects. After James Stewart left, other members of the Dewar group continued to develop a fork of MOPAC called AMPAC that was originally released on the QCPE before also becoming commercial software. VAMP (Vectorized AMPAC) was a parallel version of AMPAC developed by Timothy Clark's group at the University of Erlangen–Nuremberg. Donald Truhlar's group at the University of Minnesota developed both a fork of AMPAC with implicit solvent models, AMSOL, and a fork of MOPAC itself. Also, commercial versions of MOPAC distributed by Fujitsu have some proprietary features (e.g. PM5, Tomasi solvation) not available in other versions.

MOPAC used different versioning systems throughout its development, sometimes with a version number or year stylized into the name. These alternate names include MOPAC3, MOPAC4, MOPAC5, MOPAC6, MOPAC7, MOPAC93, MOPAC97, MOPAC 2000, MOPAC 2007, MOPAC 2009, MOPAC 2012, and MOPAC 2016. Open-source versions of MOPAC now use semantic versioning.

== See also ==
- List of quantum chemistry and solid-state physics software
- Semi-empirical quantum chemistry methods
- AMPAC
