= Phosphaethynolate =

Phosphorus-containing anion

The phosphaethynolate anion, also referred to as PCO, is the phosphorus-containing analogue of the cyanate anion with the chemical formula [PCO]^{−} or [OCP]^{−}. The anion has a linear geometry and is commonly isolated as a salt. When used as a ligand, the phosphaethynolate anion is ambidentate in nature meaning it forms complexes by coordinating via either the phosphorus or oxygen atoms. This versatile character of the anion has allowed it to be incorporated into many transition metal and actinide complexes but now the focus of the research around phosphaethynolate has turned to utilising the anion as a synthetic building block to organophosphanes.

== Synthesis ==
The first reported synthesis and characterisation of phosphaethynolate came from Becker et al. in 1992. They were able to isolate the anion as a lithium salt (in 87% yield) by reacting lithium bis(trimethylsilyl)phosphide with dimethyl carbonate. The x-ray crystallographic analysis of the anion determined the P-C bond length to be 1.555 Å (indicative of a phosphorus-carbon triple bond) and the C-O bond length to be 1.198 Å. Similar studies were performed on derivatives of this structure and the results indicated that dimerisation to form a four-membered Li ring is favoured by this molecule.

Scheme 1: Becker's synthesis of the lithium salt of PCO from 1992.

Ten years later, in 2002, Westerhausen et al. published the use of Becker's method to make a family of alkaline earth metal salts of PCO; this work involved the synthesis of the magnesium, calcium, strontium and barium bis-phosphaethynolates. Like the salts previously reported by Becker, the alkali-earth metal analogues were unstable to moisture and air and thus were required to be stored at low temperatures (around −20 °C) in dimethoxyethane solutions.

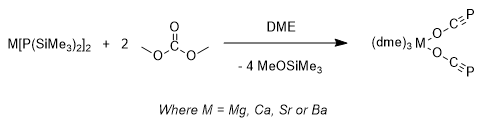
Scheme 2: Westerhausen's synthesis of the alkaline earth salts of PCO from 2002.

It was not until 2011 that the first stable salt of the phosphaethynolate anion was reported by Grutzmacher and co-workers. They managed to isolate the compound as a brown solid in 28% yield. The structure of the stable sodium salt, formed by carbonylation of sodium phosphide, contains bridging PCO units in contrast to the terminal anions found in the previously reported structures. The authors noted that this sodium salt could be handled in air as well as water without major decomposition; this emphasises the significance of the accompanying counter cation in stabilisation of PCO.

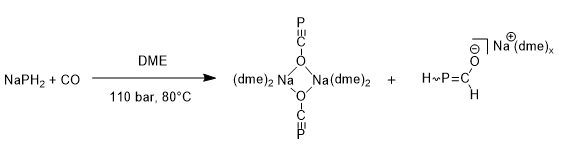
Scheme 3: Grutzmacher's synthesis of the sodium salt of PCO from 2011.

Direct carbonylation was a method also employed by Goicoechea in 2013 in order to synthesis a phosphaethynolate anion stabilised by a potassium cation sequestered in 18-crown-6. This method required the carbonylation of solutions of K_{3}P_{7} at 150 °C and produced by-products that were readily separated during aqueous work ups. The use of aqueous work ups reflects the high stability of the salt in water. This method afforded the PCO anion in reasonable yields around 43%. Characterisation of the compound involved infra-red spectroscopy; the band indicative of the P≡C triple bond stretch was observed at 1730 cm−1.

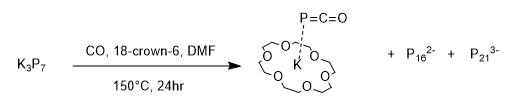
Scheme 4: Goicoechea's synthesis of the potassium stabilised salt of PCO from 2013.

== Ambidentate nature of the anion ==
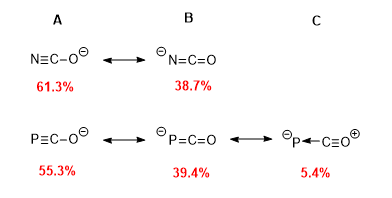
Figure 1: The different resonance forms of the NCO and PCO anions. The values were calculated with B3LYP functional and aug-cc-pVTZ basis set using NBO/NRT analysis in GAMESS.

The phosphaethynolate anion is the heavier isoelectronic congener of the cyanate anion. It has been shown that it behaves in a similar way to its lighter analogue, as an ambidentate nucleophile. This ambidentate character of the anion means that it is able to bind via both the phosphorus and oxygen atoms depending on the nature of the centre being coordinated.

Computational studies carried out on the anion such as Natural Bond Orbital (NBO) and Natural Resonance Theory (NRT) analyses can go part way to explain why PCO can react in such a manner. The two dominant resonance forms of the phosphaethynolate anion localise negative charge on either the phosphorus or oxygen atoms meaning both are sites of nucleophilicity. The same applies for the cyanate anion hence why PCO is observed to have similar pseudo-halogenic behaviour.

=== Attack by oxygen ===
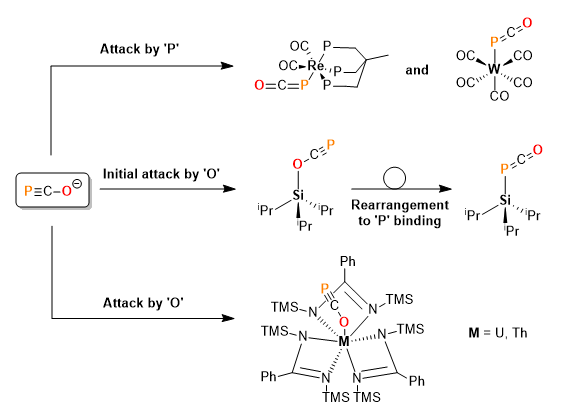
Figure 2: Reactions of the PCO anion which depict its ambidentate nature.

Coordination via the oxygen atom is favoured by hard, highly electropositive centres. This is due to the fact that oxygen is a more electronegative atom and thus prefers to bind via more ionic interactions. Examples of this type of coordination were presented in the work of Arnold et al. from 2015. The group found that actinide complexes of PCO involving uranium and thorium both coordinated through the oxygen. This is the result of the contracted nature of the actinide orbitals which makes the metal centres more 'core-like' thus favouring ionic interactions.

=== Attack by phosphorus ===
On the other hand, softer, more polarisable centres prefer to coordinate in a more covalent manner through the phosphorus atom. Examples of this include complexes accommodating a neutral or sparsely charged transition metal centre. The first example of this nature of PCO binding was published by Grutzmacher and co-workers in 2012. The group's studies used a Re(I) complex and the analysis of its bonding parameters and electronic structure showed that the phosphaethynolate anion coordinated in a bent fashion. This suggested the Re(I) – P bond possessed a highly covalent character thus the complex would be best described as a metallaphosphaketene. It wasn't until four years later that a second example of this coordination nature of PCO was identified. This time it came in the form of a W(0) pentacarbonyl complex produced by the Goicoechea group.

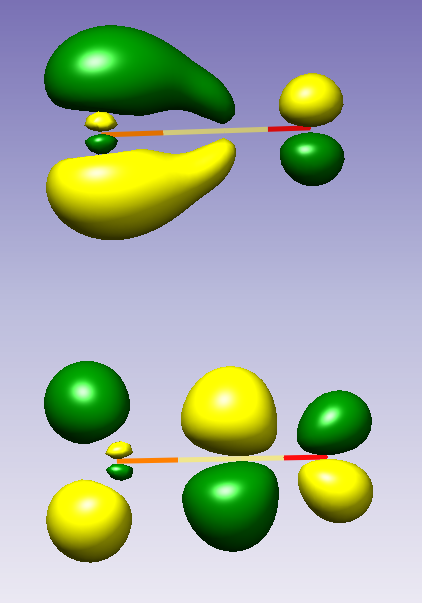
Figure 3: The HOMO and LUMO of the PCO anion; surfaces calculated with the B3LYP functional and aug-cc-pVTZ basis set using Molden and GAMESS. From left to right, the atoms are P, C and O.

=== Rearrangement of coordination character ===
There is one particular reaction studied by Grutzmacher et al. that exhibits the rearrangement of coordination character of PCO. Initially when reacting the anion with triorganyl silicon compounds, it binds via the oxygen forming the kinetic oxyphosphaalkyne product. The thermodynamic silyl phosphaketene product is generated when the kinetic product rearranges to allow PCO to coordinate through phosphorus.

The formation of the kinetic product is charged controlled and thus explains why it is formed by oxygen coordination. The oxygen atom favours a larger degree of ionic interactions as a result of its greater electronegativity. Contrastingly, the thermodynamic product of the reaction is generated under orbital control. This comes in the form of phosphorus coordination as the largest contribution in the HOMO of the anion resides on the phosphorus atom; this is clearly visible in Figure 3.

== Reactivity of the anion ==
Extensive studies involving the phosphaethynolate anion have shown that it can react in a variety of ways. It has documented use in cycloadditions, as a phosphorus transfer agent, a synthetic building block and as pseudo halide ligands (as described above).

=== Phosphorus transfer agents ===
In these types of reactions, CO is released as the phosphaethynolate anion acts as either a mild nucleophilic source of phosphorus or a Brønsted base. Examples of these types of reactions involving PCO include work conducted by Grutzmacher and Goicoechea.

In 2014, Grutzmacher et al. reported that an imidazolium salt would react with the phosphaethynolate anion to produce a phosphinidine carbene adduct. Computational mechanistic studies were conducted on this reaction using density functional theory at the B3LYP/6-31+G* level. The results of these investigations suggested that the lowest energy and therefore most likely pathway involves PCO acting as a Brønsted base initially deprotonating the acidic imidazolium cation to generate the intermediate phosphaketene, HPCO. The highly unstable protonated PCO remains hydrogen bonded to the newly produced N-heterocylic carbene prior to rearrangement and formation of the observed product. In this case, PCO does not act as a mild nucleophile due to the augmented stability of the starting imidazolium cation.

On the other hand, in the work published by Goicoechea and co-workers in 2015, the phosphaethynolate anion can be seen to act as a source of nucleophilic phosphide (P^{−}). The anion was seen to add across the Si=Si double bond of cyclotrisilene thus introducing a phosphorus vertex into its scaffold (after undergoing decarbonylation).

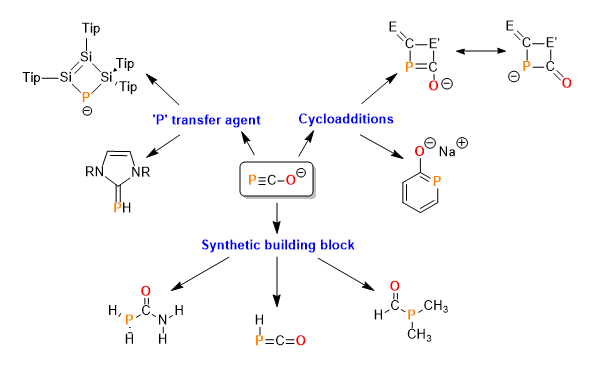
Figure 4: The different reaction pathways of the PCO anion.

=== Cycloaddition Reagents ===
After synthesising the potassium salt of the phosphaethynolate anion in 2013, Goicoechea et al. began to look into the potential of PCO towards cycloadditions. They found that the anion could react in a [2+2] fashion with a diphenyl ketene to produce the first isolatable example of a four-membered monoanionic phosphorus containing heterocycle. They employed the same method to test other unsaturated substrates such as carbodiimides and found that the likelihood of cyclisation heavily relies on the nature of the substituents on the unsaturated substrate.

Cycloaddition reactions involving the phosphaethynolate anion have also been shown by Grutzmacher and co-workers to be a viable synthetic route to other heterocycles. One simple example is the reaction between the NaPCO and an α-pyrone. This reaction yields the sodium phosphinin-2-olate salt which is stable to both air and moisture.

=== Synthetic building blocks ===
A large part of the research involving PCO is now looking into utilising the anion as a synthetic building block to derive phosphorus containing analogues of small molecules.

The first major breakthrough in this area came from Goicoechea et al. in 2013; they published the reaction between the PCO anion and ammonium salts which yielded the phosphorus containing analogue of urea in which phosphorus replaces a nitrogen atom. The group predict that this heavier congener could have applications in new materials, anion sensing and coordination chemistry.

Goicoechea and co-workers were also able to isolate the heavily sought after phosphorus containing analogue of isocyanic acid, HPCO, in 2017. This molecule is thought to be a crucial intermediate in a lot of reactions involving PCO (including P-transfer to an imidazolium cation).

Moreover, the most recent addition to this class of small molecules is the phosphorus containing analogue of N,N-dimethylformamide. This work in which the phosphorus again replaces a nitrogen atom was published in 2018 by Stephan and co-workers. Generating acylphosphines in this manner is considered a much milder route than other current strategies that require multi-step syntheses involving toxic, volatile and pyrophoric reagents.

== Other analogues ==
The other analogues of the phosphaethynolate anion all obey the general formulae E-C-X and are made by varying E and X. When changing either atom, unique trends amongst the different analogues become apparent.

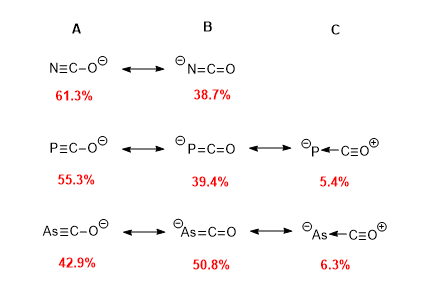
Figure 5: The different resonance forms and weights of the different ECX analogues. The values were calculated with B3LYP functional and aug-cc-pVTZ basis set using NBO/NRT analysis in GAMESS.

=== Varying E ===
As 'E' is varied by descending group 15, there is a clear shift in the weights of the resonance structures towards the phosphaketene analogue. This reflects the decrease in effective orbital overlap between E and C which in turn disfavours multiple bond formation. This increasing tendency to form double and not triple E-C bonds is also reflected in calculated E-C bond lengths. The data from Table 1 is evidence of E-C bond elongation which correlates with the change from triple to double bond.

Table 1: E-C bond lengths and delocalisation energies of the different ECO analgoues, the values were calculated with B3LYP functional and aug-cc-pVTZ basis set in GAMESS. Bond lengths taken from cited literature.
ECO	E−C bond length (Å)	Delocalisation energy (kcal/mol)
NCO	1.192	41.0
PCO	1.627	44.0
AsCO	1.740	64.0

In addition, NBO analysis highlights that the greatest electron delocalisation within the anions stems from the donation of an oxygen lone pair into the E−C π antibonding orbital. The energy value associated with this donation is seen to increase down the group. This explains the increasing resonance weight towards the ketene like isomer as populating antibonding orbitals usually suggests the breaking of a bond.

The shift towards the ketene isomer will also cause an increase in charge density on the elemental 'E' atom; this makes the elemental atom an increasing source of nucleophilicity.

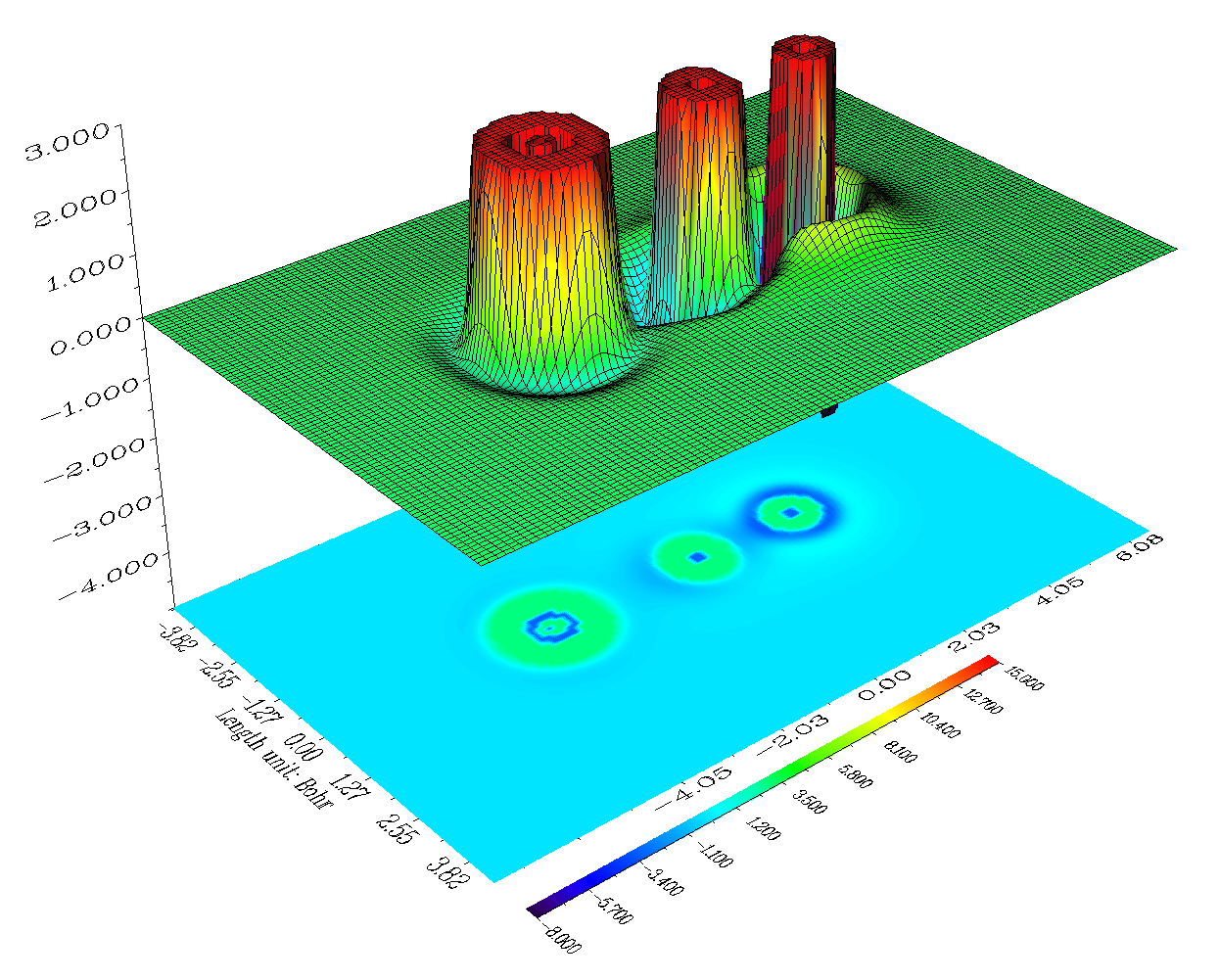
Figure 6: Stacked graph of Laplacian electron density of the PCO anion. Graph plotted in Multiwfn using the results of AIMS analysis from Molden and GAMESS. From left to right, the atoms are P, C and O.

=== Varying X ===
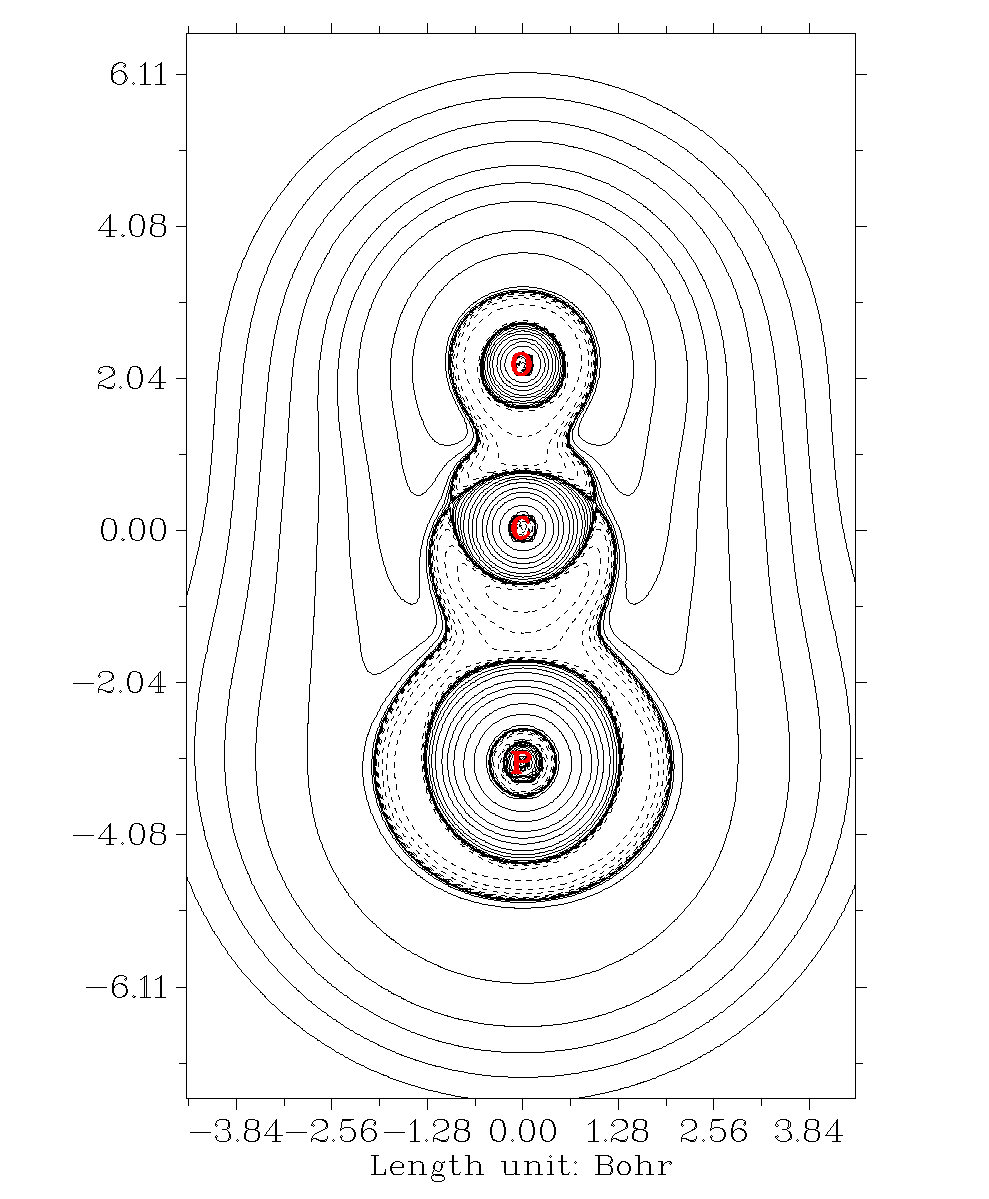
Figure 7: Contour plot of the Laplacian electron density of the PCO anion. Graph plotted in Multiwfn using the results of AIMS analysis from Molden and GAMESS. From top to bottom, the atoms are O, C and P.

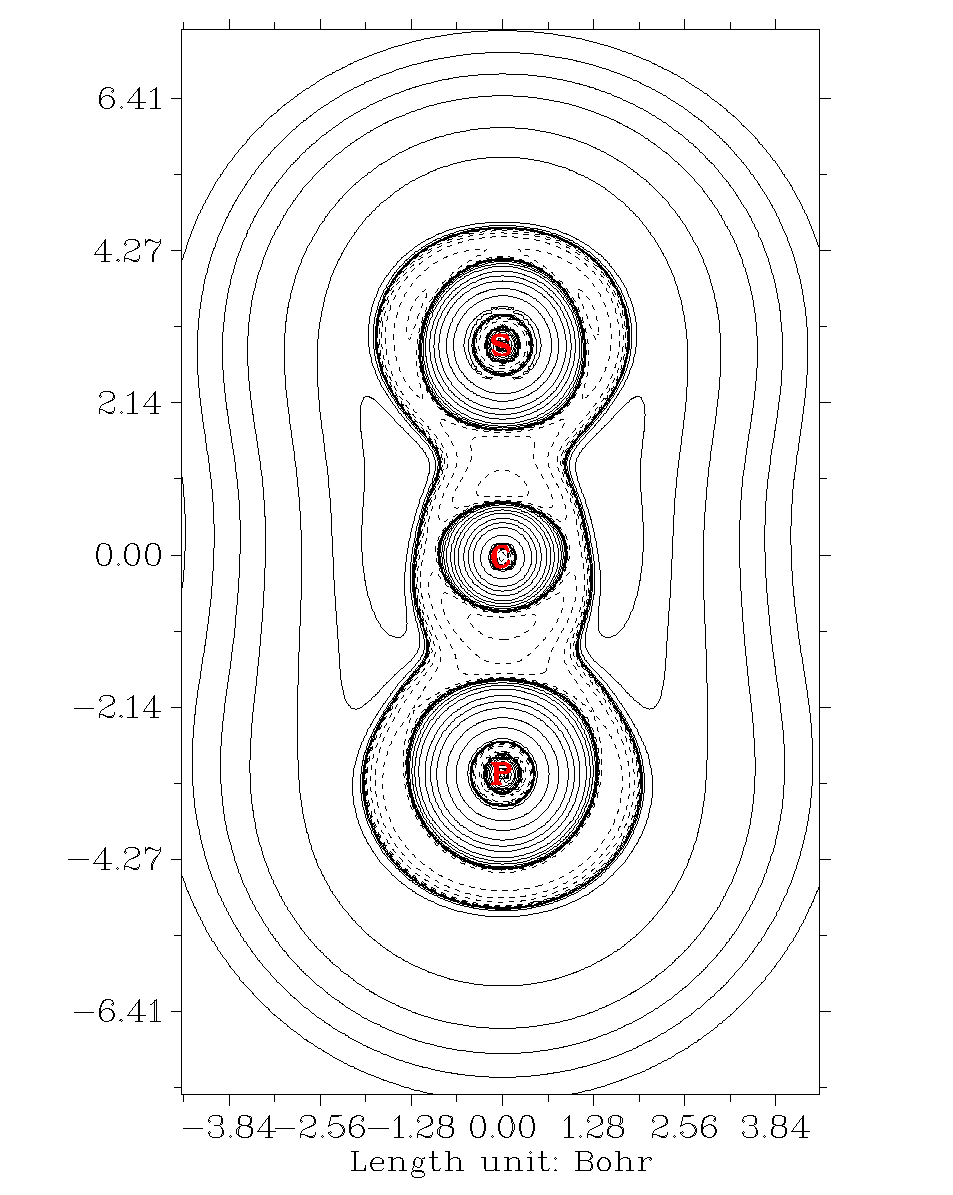
Figure 8: Contour plot of the Laplacian electron density of the PCS anion. Graph plotted in Multiwfn using the results of AIMS analysis from Molden and GAMESS. From top to bottom, the atoms are S, C and P.

Table 2: Resonance weights of the PCX analogues, the values were calculated with B3LYP functional and aug-cc-pVTZ basis set in GAMESS.
PCX	Resonance 'A' weight	Resonance 'B' weight
PCO	51.5%	38.4%
PCS	57.9%	24.2%

The simplest analogue that can be formed as 'X' is varied is PCS^{−}. This anion was first isolated by Becker et al. by reacting the phosphaethynolate anion with carbon disulphide. Unlike PCO, PCS shows ambidentate nucleophilic tendencies towards the W(0) complex mentioned above.

This is the result of a reduced difference in electronegativity between E and X thus neither atom offers a substantial advantage over the other in terms of providing ionic contributions to bonding. As a result, the average electron density in PCS is spread over the entire anion whereas in PCO, most electron density is localised on the phosphorus atom as this is the atom which bonds to form the thermodynamically favourable product.
