= PQS =

PQS can refer to:

- Personnel Qualification Standard, a set of tasks and examinations in the United States Navy
- Passive Q-switching
- Parallel Quantum Solutions, a computational chemistry computer program
- The Protein Quaternary Structure Server, an important resource in structural biology
- Potential Quadruplex-forming Sequence, in molecular biology a DNA or RNA sequence capable of forming a G-quadruplex
