= UK Molecular R-matrix Codes =

The UK Molecular R-Matrix codes are a set of software routines used to calculate the effects of collision of electrons with atoms and molecules. The R-matrix method is used in computational quantum mechanics to study scattering of positrons and electrons by atomic and molecular targets. The fundamental idea was originally introduced by Eugene Wigner and Leonard Eisenbud in the 1940s. The method uses the fixed nuclei approximation, where the molecule's nuclei are considered fixed when collision occurs and the electronic part of the problem is solved. This information is then plugged into calculations which take into account nuclear motion. The UK Molecular R-Matrix codes were developed by the Collaborative Computational Project Q (CCPQ).

== Software ==
The CCPQ and CCP2 have supported various incarnations of the UK Molecular R-matrix project for almost 40 years. The UK Molecular R-Matrix Group is actually a subgroup of CCP2, and their codes are maintained by Professor Jonathan Tennyson and his group of researchers. Advances in research have shown that the UK Molecular R-matrix codes can be used to explain scattering problems involving light molecular targets.

Quantemol-N (QN) is software that allows the UK molecular R-matrix codes, which is used to model electron-polyatomic molecule interactions, to be employed quickly with reduced set-up times. QN is an interface that simplifies the process of using the sophisticated UK molecular R-Matrix codes.

== See also ==
- Quantemol
