= AMPAC =

AMPAC is a general-purpose semiempirical quantum chemistry program. It is marketed by Semichem, Inc. and was developed originally by Michael Dewar and his group.

The first version of AMPAC (2.1) was made available in 1985 through the Quantum Chemistry Program Exchange (QCPE). Subsequent versions were released through the same source, representing minor updates and optimized versions for other platforms.

In 1992, Semichem, Inc. was formed at Professor Dewar's urging to maintain and market the program. AMPAC 4.0 with Graphical User Interface was released in August of that year. Semichem's current version of AMPAC is 10.

AMPAC current implements the SAM1, AM1, MNDO, MNDO/d, PM3, MNDOC MINDO/3, RM1 and PM6 semi-empirical methods and AMSOL and COSMO salvation models.

== See also ==
- Quantum chemistry computer programs
