= Collaborative Computational Project Q =

Computational particle physics project

Collaborative Computational Project Q (CCPQ) was developed in order to provide software which uses theoretical techniques to catalogue collisions between electrons, positrons or photons and atomic/molecular targets. The 'Q' stands for quantum dynamics. This project is accessible via the CCPForge website, which contains numerous other projects such as CCP2 and CCP4. The scope has increased to include atoms and molecules in strong (long-pulse and attosecond) laser fields, low-energy interactions of antihydrogen with small atoms and molecules, cold atoms, Bose–Einstein condensates and optical lattices. CCPQ gives essential information on the reactivity of various molecules, and contains two community codes R-matrix suite and MCTDH wavepacket dynamics.

The project is supported by the Atomic and Molecular Physics group at Daresbury Laboratory, which supports research in core computational and scientific codes and research.

This project is a collaboration between University College London (UCL), University of Bath, and Queen's University Belfast. The project is led by Professor Graham Worth who is the Chair, alongside Vice-Chairs Dr Stephen Clark and Professor Hugo van der Hart. Quantemol Ltd is also a close partner of the project. The project is a result of the previous Collaborative Computation Project 2 (CCP2), and is an improved version of this older project. CCPQ (and its predecessor CCP2) have supported various incarnations of the UK Molecular R-matrix project for almost 40 years.

== Applications ==
Both academic and industrial researchers use CCPQ. One of its uses is in the field of plasma research; reliable data on electron and light interactions is essential in order to model plasma processes used both on a small and large scale. Large scale industrial processes need to investigate the implementation of new methods thoroughly, and CCPQ can be used to theoretically determine the value of new processes.

CCPQ has been used to study the Hubbard models for cold atoms in optical lattices, as it provides codes used in this area of research. CCPQ hosted the necessary code on the CCPForge website, which contains other computational research projects.
