= NDDO =

In computational chemistry, NDDO (neglect of diatomic differential overlap) is a formalism that was first introduced by John Pople; it is the basis for most semiempirical methods. While INDO added all one-centre two electron integrals to the CNDO/2 formalism, NDDO adds all two centre integrals for repulsion between a charge distribution on one centre and a charge distribution on another centre. Otherwise, the zero-differential overlap approximation is used. The common software program is MOPAC (Molecular Orbital PACkage).

In the NDDO method, the overlap matrix S is replaced by the unit matrix. This allows the Hartree–Fock secular equation $|H-ES| = 0$ to be replaced with a simpler equation, $|H-E| = 0$. The two-electron integrals from the NDDO approximation can either be one-, two-, three- or four-centered.

The one- and two-centered integrals are evaluated approximately or parameterized based on the experimental data, while the three- and four-centered integrals vanish. Usually, only the valence electrons are treated quantum mechanically, while the role of the core electrons is to reduce the nuclear charge. Semiempirical calculations are usually carried out in a minimal basis set.

== See also ==
- MNDO
- AM1
- PM3
- SAM1
- RM1
- MOPAC
