= AM1* =

AM1* is a semiempirical molecular orbital technique in computational chemistry. The method was developed by Timothy Clark and co-workers (in Computer-Chemie-Centrum, Universität Erlangen-Nürnberg) and published first in 2003.

Indeed, AM1* is an extension of AM1 molecular orbital theory and uses AM1 parameters and theory unchanged for the elements H, C, N, O and F. But, other elements have been parameterized using an additional set of d-orbitals in the basis set and with two-center core–core parameters, rather than the Gaussian functions used to modify the core–core potential in AM1. Additionally, for transition metal-hydrogen interactions, a distance dependent term is used to calculate core-core potentials rather than the constant term.

AM1* parameters are now available for H, C, N, O, F, Al, Si, P, S, Cl, Ti, V, Cr, Mn, Fe, Co, Ni, Cu, Zn, Br, Zr, Mo, Pd, Ag, I and Au.

AM1* is implemented in VAMP 10.0 and Materials Studio (Accelrys Software Inc.).
