= CCPForge =

Computational tools for science

The Collaborative Computational Projects (CCP) group was responsible for the development of CCPForge, which is a software development tool produced through collaborations by the CCP community. CCPs allow experts in computational research to come together and develop scientific software which can be applied to numerous research fields. It is used as a tool in many research and development areas, and hosts a variety of projects. Every CCP project is the result of years of valuable work by computational researchers.

It is advised for projects to have one application, this helps users to search a category and classification system so they can find the right project for their work. Furthermore, the project can be under up to three CCPs provided it is a collaboration. Each classification category will have sub-sections to filter the category further. CCPForge projects, such provide essential information which has been used in publications such as 'Recent developments in R-matrix applications to molecular processes' and 'Ab initio derivation of Hubbard models for cold atoms in optical lattices', in which codes from CCPQ were used.

The Joint Information Systems Committee (JISC) and EPSRC both fund the CCPForge project. The Scientific Computing Department (SCD) of the Science and Technology Facilities Council is responsible for the development and maintenance of CCPForge, and this is funded by a long-term support grant from EPSRC.

== Current Projects ==
CCP4	Macromolecular Crystallography
CCP5	The Computer Simulation of Condensed Phases
CCP9	Computational Electronic Structure of Condensed Matter
CCP12	High Performance Computing in Engineering
CCP-BioSim	Biomolecular Simulation at the Life Sciences Interface
CCP-EM	Electron Cryo-Microscopy
CCPi	Tomographic Imaging
CCPN	NMR
CCP-NC	NMR Crystallography
CCP-Plasma	Computational Plasma Physics
CCPQ *	Quantum Dynamics in Atomic, Molecular and Optical Physics
CCP-SAS	Analysis of Structural Data in Chemical Biology and Soft Condensed Matter
CCPForge	Collaborative Software Development Environment Tool
CCPPET/MR	Positron Emission Tomography (PET) and Magnetic Resonance (MR) Imaging
CCP CoDiMa	Computational Discrete Mathematics
CCP-WSI	A Collaborative Computational Project in Wave/Structure Interaction
CCPmag	Computational Magnetism

* CCPQ was formed from CCP2 "Continuum States of Atoms and Molecules", incorporating aspects of CCP6 "Molecular Quantum Dynamics".
