= Peter Pulay =

Hungarian theoretical chemist (born 1941)

Péter Pulay (born September 20, 1941) is a theoretical chemist. He is the Roger B. Bost Distinguished Professor of Chemistry in the Department of Chemistry and Biochemistry at the University of Arkansas, United States.

== Education and career ==
Pulay was born in Veszprém in the Kingdom of Hungary. He attended Eötvös Loránd University and graduated with a diploma in chemistry in 1963. He then studied at University of Stuttgart, where he received a PhD in theoretical chemistry in 1970. His supervisors were Josef Goubeau and Heinzwerner Preuss. After graduation, Pulay worked at the Hungarian Academy of Sciences after graduation and was promoted to docent at Eötvös Loránd University in 1977. Since 1982, he has been professor at University of Arkansas.

One of his most important contributions is the introduction of the gradient method in quantum chemistry. This allows the prediction of the geometric structure of a molecule using computational chemical programs to be almost routine. He is the main author of the PQS computational chemistry program.

His work was cited in the official background material for the 1998 Nobel Prize in chemistry.

== Honors and awards ==
Among many honors, he was made a Foreign Member of the Hungarian Academy of Sciences in 1993. He is a member of the International Academy of Quantum Molecular Science. In 2017, Pulay received the ACS Award in Theoretical Chemistry.

== See also ==
- Direct inversion in the iterative subspace
- Pulay stress
