= Austin Model 1 =

Austin Model 1, or AM1, is a semi-empirical method for the quantum calculation of molecular electronic structure in computational chemistry. It is based on the Neglect of Differential Diatomic Overlap integral approximation. Specifically, it is a generalization of the modified neglect of differential diatomic overlap approximation. Related methods are PM3 and the older MINDO.

AM1 was developed by Michael Dewar and co-workers and published in 1985. AM1 is an attempt to improve the MNDO model by reducing the repulsion of atoms at close separation distances. The atomic core-atomic core terms in the MNDO equations were modified through the addition of off-center attractive and repulsive Gaussian functions.

The complexity of the parameterization problem increased in AM1 as the number of parameters per atom increased from 7 in MNDO to 13-16 per atom in AM1.

The results of AM1 calculations are sometimes used as the starting points for parameterizations of forcefields in molecular modelling.

AM1 is implemented in the MOPAC, AMPAC, Gaussian, CP2K, GAMESS (US), PC GAMESS, GAMESS (UK), and SPARTAN programs.

An extension of AM1 is SemiChem Austin Model 1 (SAM1), which is implemented in the AMPAC program and which explicitly treats d-orbitals.

An extension of AM1 is AM1* that is available in VAMP software.

== See also ==
- Semi-empirical quantum chemistry methods
