= TeraChem =

Computational chemistry software program

- Developer: PetaChem
- Initial release: May 2010; 15 years ago
- Stable release: 1.93P / August 16, 2017; 8 years ago
- Written in: C, CUDA
- Operating system: Linux
- Platform: x86-64, Nvidia GPUs
- Type: Molecular modelling
- License: Proprietary commercial software
- Website: petachem.com

TeraChem is a computational chemistry software program designed for CUDA-enabled Nvidia GPUs. The initial development started at the University of Illinois at Urbana-Champaign and was subsequently commercialized. It is currently distributed by PetaChem, LLC, located in Silicon Valley. As of 2020, the software package is still under active development.

== Core features ==
TeraChem is capable of fast ab initio molecular dynamics and can utilize density functional theory (DFT) methods for nanoscale biomolecular systems with hundreds of atoms. All the methods used are based on Gaussian orbitals, in order to improve performance on contemporary (2010s) computer hardware.

== Press coverage ==
- Chemical and Engineering News (C&EN) magazine of the American Chemical Society first mentioned the development of TeraChem in Fall 2008.
- Recently, C&EN magazine has a feature article covering molecular modeling on GPU and TeraChem.
- According to the 2010 post at the Nvidia blog, TeraChem has been tested to deliver 8-50 times better performance than General Atomic and Molecular Structure System (GAMESS). In that benchmark, TeraChem was executed on a desktop machine with four (4) Tesla GPUs and GAMESS was running on a cluster of 256 quad core CPUs.
- TeraChem is available for free via GPU Test Drive.

== Major release history ==
2017

- TeraChem version 1.93P

Support for Maxwell and Pascal GPUs (e.g. Titan X-Pascal, P100)
Use of multiple basis sets for different elements $multibasis
Use of polarizable continuum methods for ground and excited states

2016

- TeraChem version 1.9

Support for Maxwell cards (e.g., GTX 980, Titan X)
Effective core potentials (and gradients)
Time-dependent density functional theory
Continuum solvation models (COSMO)

2012

- TeraChem version 1.5

Full support of polarization functions: energy, gradients, ab initio dynamics and range-corrected DFT functionals (CAMB3LYP, wPBE, wB97x)

2011

- TeraChem version 1.5a (pre-release)

Alpha version with the full support of d-functions: energy, gradients, ab initio dynamics

- TeraChem version 1.43b-1.45b

Beta version with polarization functions for energy calculation (HF/DFT levels) as well as other improvements.

- TeraChem version 1.42

This version was first deployed at National Center for Supercomputing Applications' (NCSA) Lincoln supercomputer for National Science Foundation (NSF) TeraGrid users as announced in NCSA press release.

2010

- TeraChem version 1.0
- TeraChem version 1.0b

The very first initial beta release was reportedly downloaded more than 4,000 times.

== Publication list ==
- Charge Transfer and Polarization in Solvated Proteins from Ab Initio Molecular Dynamics I. S. Ufimtsev, N. Luehr and T. J. Martinez Journal of Physical Chemistry Letters, Vol. 2, 1789-1793 (2011)
- Excited-State Electronic Structure with Configuration Interaction Singles and Tamm-Dancoff Time-Dependent Density Functional Theory on Graphical Processing Units C. M. Isborn, N. Luehr, I. S. Ufimtsev and T. J. Martinez Journal of Chemical Theory and Computation, Vol. 7, 1814-1823 (2011)
- Dynamic Precision for Electron Repulsion Integral Evaluation on Graphical Processing Units (GPUs) N. Luehr, I. S. Ufimtsev, and T. J. Martinez Journal of Chemical Theory and Computation, Vol. 7, 949-954 (2011)
- Quantum Chemistry on Graphical Processing Units. 3. Analytical Energy Gradients and First Principles Molecular Dynamics I. S. Ufimtsev and T. J. Martinez Journal of Chemical Theory and Computation, Vol. 5, 2619-2628 (2009)
- Quantum Chemistry on Graphical Processing Units. 2. Direct Self-Consistent Field Implementation I. S. Ufimtsev and T. J. Martinez Journal of Chemical Theory and Computation, Vol. 5, 1004-1015 (2009)
- Quantum Chemistry on Graphical Processing Units. 1. Strategies for Two-Electron Integral Evaluation I. S. Ufimtsev and T. J. Martinez Journal of Chemical Theory and Computation, Vol. 4, 222-231 (2008)
- Graphical Processing Units for Quantum Chemistry I. S. Ufimtsev and T. J. Martinez Computing in Science and Engineering, Vol. 10, 26-34 (2008)
- Preparation and characterization of stable aqueous higher-order fullerenes Nirupam Aich, Joseph R V Flora and Navid B Saleh Nanotechnology, Vol. 23, 055705 (2012)
- Filled Pentagons and Electron Counting Rule for Boron Fullerenes Kregg D. Quarles, Cherno B. Kah, Rosi N. Gunasinghe, Ryza N. Musin, and Xiao-Qian Wang Journal of Chemical Theory Computation, Vol. 7, 2017–2020 (2011)
- Sensitivity Analysis of Cluster Models for Calculating Adsorption Energies for Organic Molecules on Mineral Surfaces M. P. Andersson and S. L. S. Stipp Journal of Physical Chemistry C, Vol. 115, 10044–10055 (2011)
- Dispersion corrections in the boron buckyball and nanotubes Rosi N. Gunasinghe, Cherno B. Kah, Kregg D. Quarles, and Xiao-Qian Wang Applied Physics Letters 98, 261906 (2011) * Structural and electronic stability of a volleyball-shaped B80 fullerene Xiao-Qian Wang Physical Review B 82, 153409 (2010)
- Ab Initio Molecular Dynamics Simulations of Ketocyanine Dyes in Organic Solvents Andrzej Eilmes Lecture Notes in Computer Science, 7136/2012, 276-284 (2012)
- State Equation of a Model Methane Clathrate Cage Ruben Santamaria, Juan-Antonio Mondragon-Sanchez and Xim Bokhimi J. Phys. Chem. A, ASAP (2012)

== See also ==
- Quantum chemistry computer programs
- Molecular design software
- Molecule editor
- Comparison of software for molecular mechanics modeling
- List of software for Monte Carlo molecular modeling
