= Michael J. S. Dewar =

American chemist

Michael Dewar
- Born: Michael James Steuart Dewar; 24 September 1918; Ahmednagar, Ahmednagar District, Bombay Presidency, British India (now in Maharashtra, India)
- Died: 10 October 1997 (aged 79); Gainesville, Florida, US
- Education: University of Oxford (BA, DPhil)
- Known for: Dewar reactivity number Dewar–Zimmerman analysis Dewar–Chatt–Duncanson model Semi-empirical quantum chemistry methods
- Awards: Tilden Prize (1954); FRS (1960); Davy Medal (1982); William H. Nichols Medal (1986); Tetrahedron Prize (1989)
- Scientific career
- Workplaces: University of London 1951– University of Chicago 1959– University of Texas 1963– University of Florida 1989–1994
- Thesis: New explosives (1942)
- Doctoral advisor: Frederick E. King
- Doctoral students: Nenad Trinajstić

Stipitatic acid

Michael James Steuart Dewar (24 September 1918 – 10 October 1997) was an American theoretical chemist.

== Education and early life ==
Dewar was the son of Scottish parents, Annie Balfour (Keith) and Francis Dewar. He received the degrees of Bachelor of Arts, Master of Arts, and DPhil from Balliol College, Oxford.

== Career and research ==
Dewar was appointed to the Chair in Chemistry at Queen Mary College of the University of London in 1951. He moved to the University of Chicago in 1959 and then to the first Robert A. Welch research chair at the University of Texas at Austin in 1963. After a long and productive period there, he moved to the University of Florida in 1989. He retired in 1994 as Professor Emeritus at the University of Florida. He died in 1997.

Dewar's reputation for providing original solutions to vexing puzzles first developed when he was still a postdoctoral fellow at the University of Oxford. In 1945, he deduced the correct structure for stipitatic acid, a mould product whose structure had baffled the leading chemists of the day. It involved a new kind of aromatic structure with a seven-membered ring for which Dewar coined the term tropolone. The discovery of the tropolone structure launched the field of non-benzenoid aromaticity, which witnessed feverish activity for several decades and greatly expanded the chemists' understanding of cyclic π-electron systems. Also in 1945, Dewar devised the then novel notion of a π complex, which he proposed as an intermediate in the benzidine rearrangement. This offered the first correct rationalisation of the electronic structure of complexes of transition metals with alkenes, later known as the Dewar–Chatt–Duncanson model.

In the early 1950s, Dewar wrote a famous series of six articles on a general Molecular orbital Theory of Organic Chemistry, which extended and generalised Erich Hückel's original quantum mechanical treatments by using perturbation theory and resonance theory, and which in many ways originated the modern era of theoretical and computational organic chemistry. Following Woodward and Hoffmann's suggestion of selection rules for pericyclic reactions, Dewar championed (concurrently with Howard Zimmerman) an alternative approach (which he erroneously felt had been pioneered by M. G. Evans) to understanding pericyclic reactivity based on aromatic and antiaromatic transition states. He did not however believe in the utility of Möbius aromaticity, introduced by Edgar Heilbronner in 1964, and now a flourishing area of chemistry.

He is known most famously for the development in the 1970s and 1980s of the Semi-empirical quantum chemistry methods, MINDO, MNDO, AM1 and PM3 that are in the MOPAC computer program, and which for the first time enabled the quantitative study of the structure and mechanism of reaction (transition state) of many real (i.e. large) systems. This was illustrated in 1974 by computing (using the technique of energy minimisation) the structure of a molecule as large as LSD (with 49 atoms) at a quantum mechanical level (the calculation taking several days of the then state-of-the-art supercomputer time, a CDC 6600). It is worth noting that in 2006, the equivalent calculation takes less than 1 minute on a personal computer. In 2006, the same structure computation can now be completed using high-level ab initio or density functional procedures in less than two days, and semiempirical programs can be used to optimise the structures of molecules with perhaps 10,000 atoms.

He was a member of the International Academy of Quantum Molecular Science.

=== Awards and honours ===
His accolades include: Fellow of the American Academy of Arts and Sciences (1966); Member of the National Academy of Sciences (1983); Honorary Fellow, Balliol College, Oxford (1974); Tilden Medal of the Chemical Society (1954); Harrison Howe Award of the American Chemical Society (1961); Robert Robinson Medal, Chemical Society (1974); G.W. Wheland Medal of the University of Chicago (1976); Evans Award, The Ohio State University (1977); Southwest Regional Award of the American Chemical Society (1978); Davy Medal (1982); James Flack Norris Award of the American Chemical Society (1984); William H. Nichols Award of the American Chemical Society (1986); Auburn-G. M. Kosolapoff Award of the American Chemical Society (1988); Tetrahedron Prize for Creativity in Organic Chemistry (1989); WATOC Medal (World Association of Theoretical Organic Chemists Medal), (1990).

== Personal life ==
He is the father of Robert Dewar and C.E. Steuart Dewar.
