= Symmetry-adapted perturbation theory =

Symmetry-adapted perturbation theory or SAPT is a methodology in electronic structure theory developed to describe non-covalent interactions between atoms and/or molecules. SAPT is a member of the family of methods known as energy decomposition analysis (EDA). Most EDA methods decompose a total interaction energy that is computed via a supermolecular approach, such that:

$\Delta E_{\rm int}=E_{\rm AB}-E_{\rm A}-E_{\rm B}$

where $\Delta E_{\rm int}$ is the total interaction energy obtained via subtracting isolated monomer energies $E_{\rm A}$ and $E_{\rm B}$ from the dimer energy $E_{\rm AB}$. A key deficiency of the supermolecular interaction energy is that it is susceptible to basis set superposition error (BSSE).

The major difference between SAPT and supermolecular EDA methods is that, as the name suggests, SAPT computes the interaction energy directly via a perturbative approach. One consequence of capturing the total interaction energy as a perturbation to the total system energy rather than using the subtractive supermolecular method outlined above, is that the interaction energy is made free of BSSE in a natural way.

Being a perturbation expansion, SAPT also provides insight into the contributing components to the interaction energy. The lowest-order expansion at which all interaction energy components are obtained is second-order in the intermolecular perturbation. The simplest such SAPT approach is called SAPT0 because it neglects intramolecular correlation effects (i.e., it is based on Hartree–Fock densities). SAPT0 captures the classical electrostatic interaction of two charge densities and exchange (or Pauli repulsion) at first-order, and at second-order the terms for electrostatic induction (the polarization of the molecular orbitals in the electric field of the interacting atom/molecule) and dispersion (see London dispersion) appear, along with their exchange counterparts.

$E_{\rm int}^{\rm SAPT0}=E_{\rm elst}^{(1)}+E_{\rm exch}^{(1)}+E_{\rm ind}^{(2)}+E_\text{exch-ind}^{(2)}+E_{\rm disp}^{(2)}+E_\text{exch-disp}^{(2)}$

Higher terms in the perturbation series can be accounted for using many-body perturbation theory or coupled-cluster approaches. Alternatively, density functional theory variants of SAPT have been formulated. The higher-level SAPT methods approach supermolecular coupled-cluster singles, doubles, and perturbative triples [CCSD(T)] in accuracy.
