= Massively parallel quantum chemistry =

Massively Parallel Quantum Chemistry
- Initial release: 2008; 18 years ago
- Final release: 4 / 24 September 2018; 7 years ago
- Written in: C++, C, FORTRAN 77
- Operating system: Linux: Debian, Ubuntu
- Platform: x86-64
- Available in: English
- Type: Computational chemistry
- License: GNU General Public License
- Website: www.mpqc.org

Massively Parallel Quantum Chemistry (MPQC) is an ab initio computational chemistry software program. Three features distinguish it from other quantum chemistry programs such as Gaussian and GAMESS: The design is object-oriented, and created for parallel computing from the start. It is available for two Linux distributions: Debian and Ubuntu. It is free and open-source software with a GNU General Public License.

MPQC provides implementations for a number of important methods for calculating electronic structure, including Hartree–Fock method, Møller–Plesset perturbation theory (including its explicitly correlated linear R12 versions), and density functional theory.

== See also ==
- List of quantum chemistry and solid state physics software
