= MINDO =

MINDO, or Modified Intermediate Neglect of Differential Overlap is a semi-empirical method for the quantum calculation of molecular electronic structure in computational chemistry. It is based on the Intermediate Neglect of Differential Overlap (INDO) method of John Pople. It was developed by the group of Michael Dewar and was the original method in the MOPAC program. The method should actually be referred to as MINDO/3. It was later replaced by the MNDO method, which in turn was replaced by the PM3 and AM1 methods.
