= MNDO =

MNDO, or Modified Neglect of Diatomic Overlap is a semi-empirical method for the quantum calculation of molecular electronic structure in computational chemistry. It is based on the Neglect of Diatomic Differential Overlap integral approximation. Similarly, this method replaced the earlier MINDO method. It is part of the MOPAC program and was developed in the group of Michael Dewar. It is also part of the AMPAC, GAMESS (US), PC GAMESS, GAMESS (UK), Gaussian, ORCA and CP2K programs.

Later, it was essentially replaced by two new methods, PM3 and AM1, which are similar but have different parameterisation methods.

The extension by W. Thiel's group, called MNDO/d, which adds d functions, is widely used for organometallic compounds. It is included in GAMESS (UK).

MNDOC, also from W. Thiel's group, explicitly adds correlation effects though second order perturbation theory with the parameters fitted to experiment from the correlated calculation. In this way, the method should give better results for systems where correlation is particularly important and different from that in the ground state molecules from the MNDO training set. This includes excited states and transition states. However, Cramer argues that "the model has not been compared to other NDDO models to the extent required to assess whether the formalism fulfills its potential."
