= PSI (computational chemistry) =

Psi4
- Developer: The Psi4 Project
- Stable release: Psi4 1.11.0 / June 29, 2026; 55 days ago
- Written in: C++, Python
- Operating system: Linux, Microsoft Windows, Mac OS X
- Type: Computational chemistry
- License: GPL
- Website: http://www.psicode.org
- Repository: github.com/psi4/psi4

Psi is an ab initio computational chemistry package originally written by the research group of Henry F. Schaefer, III (University of Georgia). Utilizing Psi, one can perform a calculation on a molecular system with various kinds of methods such as Hartree-Fock, Post-Hartree–Fock electron correlation methods, and density functional theory. The program can compute energies, optimize molecular geometries, and compute vibrational frequencies. The major part of the program is written in C++, while Python API is also available, which allows users to perform complex computations or automate tasks easily.

Psi4 is the latest release of the program package - it is open source, released as free under the LGPL3 through GitHub. Primary development of Psi4 is currently performed by the research groups of David Sherrill (Georgia Tech), T. Daniel Crawford (Virginia Tech), Francesco Evangelista (Emory University), and Henry F. Schaefer, III (University of Georgia), with substantial contributions by Justin Turney (University of Georgia), Andy Simmonett (NIH), and Rollin King (Bethel University). Psi4 is available on Linux releases such as Fedora and Ubuntu.

== Features ==
The basic capabilities of Psi are concentrated around the following methods of quantum chemistry:

- Hartree–Fock method
- Density functional theory
- Møller–Plesset perturbation theory
- Coupled cluster
- CASSCF
- Multireference configuration interaction methods
- Symmetry-adapted perturbation theory

Several methods are available for computing excited electronic states, including configuration interaction singles (CIS), the random phase approximation (RPA), time-dependent density functional theory (TD-DFT), and equation-of-motion coupled cluster (EOM-CCSD).

Psi4 has introduced the density-fitting approximation in many portions of the code, leading to faster computations and reduced I/O requirements.

Psi4 is the preferred quantum chemistry backend for the OpenFermion project, which seeks to perform quantum chemistry computations on quantum computers.

In Psi4 1.4, the program was adapted to facilitate high-throughput workflows and can be connected to BrianQC to speed up calculations for Hartree-Fock and Density functional theory methods.

== See also ==
- List of quantum chemistry and solid-state physics software
