= CP2K =

Quantum chemistry and physics software

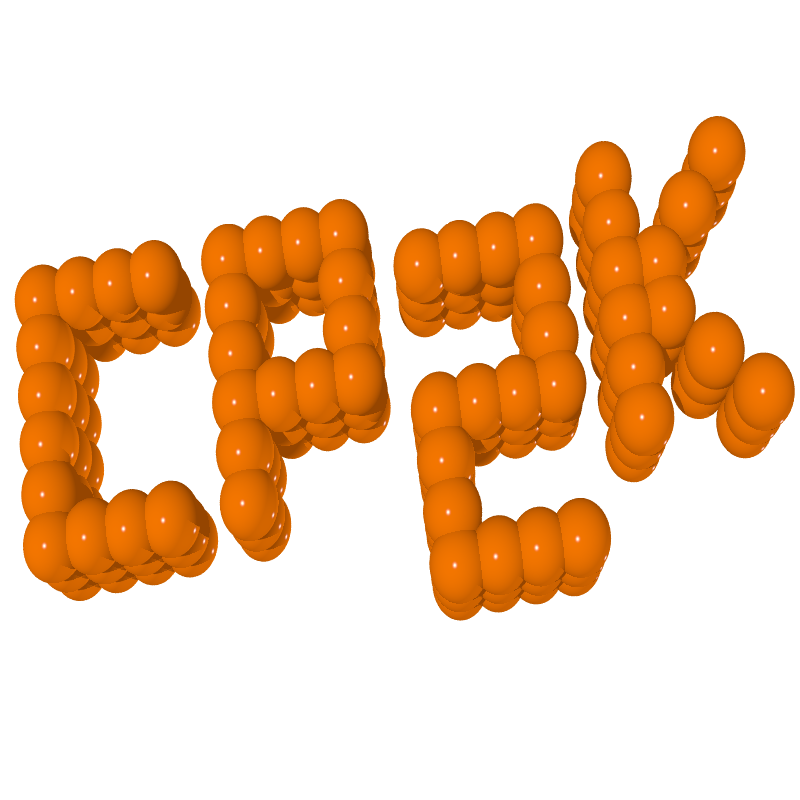
- Developer: CP2K developer group
- Release: 2000
- Stable release: 2026.2 / 15 July 2026
- Written in: Fortran
- Operating system: Linux, macOS, Windows
- Type: Ab initio quantum chemistry methods, Molecular dynamics, Density functional theory, Car–Parrinello molecular dynamics, Computational chemistry
- License: GNU General Public License
- Website: cp2k.org
- Repository: github.com/cp2k/cp2k

CP2K is a freely available (GPL) quantum chemistry and solid state physics program package, written in Fortran 2008, to perform atomistic simulations of solid state, liquid, molecular, periodic, material, crystal, and biological systems. It provides a general framework for different methods: density functional theory (DFT) using a mixed Gaussian and plane waves approach (GPW) via LDA, GGA, MP2, or RPA levels of theory, classical pair and many-body potentials, semi-empirical (AM1, PM3, MNDO, MNDOd, PM6) and tight-binding Hamiltonians, as well as Quantum Mechanics/Molecular Mechanics (QM/MM) hybrid schemes relying on the Gaussian Expansion of the Electrostatic Potential (GEEP). The Gaussian and Augmented Plane Waves method (GAPW) as an extension of the GPW method allows for all-electron calculations. CP2K can do simulations of molecular dynamics, metadynamics, Monte Carlo, Ehrenfest dynamics, vibrational analysis, core level spectroscopy, energy minimization, and transition state optimization using NEB or dimer method.

CP2K provides editor plugins for Vim and Emacs syntax highlighting, along with other tools for input generation and output processing.

== See also ==
- Car–Parrinello molecular dynamics
- Computational chemistry
- Molecular dynamics
- Monte Carlo algorithm
- Energy minimization
- Quantum chemistry
- Quantum chemistry computer programs
- Ab initio quantum chemistry methods
- Møller–Plesset perturbation theory
- Hartree–Fock method
- Random phase approximation
- Density functional theory
- Harris functional
- Tight binding
- Semi-empirical quantum chemistry method

== Key Papers ==
- Iannuzzi, Marcella; Wilhelm, Jan; et al. (2026). "The CP2K Program Package Made Simple". The Journal of Physical Chemistry B. 130 (4): 1237–1310. doi:10.1021/acs.jpcb.5c05851. PMC 12862821.
- Kühne, Thomas; Iannuzzi, Marcella; et al. (2020). "CP2K: An electronic structure and molecular dynamics software package - Quickstep: Efficient and accurate electronic structure calculations". Journal of Chemical Physics. 152 (19): 194103. arXiv:2003.03868. Bibcode:2020JChPh.152s4103K. doi:10.1063/5.0007045. PMID 33687235.
- Kühne, Thomas D. (2014). "Second generation Car–Parrinello molecular dynamics". WIREs Computational Molecular Science. 4 (4): 391–406. arXiv:1201.5945. doi:10.1002/wcms.1176. S2CID 15360296.
- Kühne, Thomas D.; Krack, Matthias; Mohamed, Fawzi; Parrinello, Michele (2007). "Efficient and Accurate Car-Parrinello-like Approach to Born-Oppenheimer Molecular Dynamics". Physical Review Letters. 98 (6) 066401. arXiv:cond-mat/0610552. Bibcode:2007PhRvL..98f6401K. doi:10.1103/PhysRevLett.98.066401. PMID 17358962. S2CID 8088072.
- Laino, Teodoro; Mohamed, Fawzi; Laio, Alessandro; Parrinello, Michele (2006). "An Efficient Linear-Scaling Electrostatic Coupling for Treating Periodic Boundary Conditions in QM/MM Simulations". Journal of Chemical Theory and Computation. 2 (5): 1370–1378. doi:10.1021/ct6001169. PMID 26626844.
- Laino, Teodoro; Mohamed, Fawzi; Laio, Alessandro; Parrinello, Michele (2005). "An Efficient Real Space Multigrid QM/MM Electrostatic Coupling". Journal of Chemical Theory and Computation. 1 (6): 1176–1184. doi:10.1021/ct050123f. PMID 26631661.
- Krack, Matthias; Parrinello, Michele (2000). "All-electron ab-initio molecular dynamics". Physical Chemistry Chemical Physics. 2 (10): 2105–2112. Bibcode:2000PCCP....2.2105K. doi:10.1039/B001167N. S2CID 97061785.
- Lippert, Gerald; Hutter, Jürg; Parrinello, Michele (1999). "The Gaussian and augmented-plane-wave density functional method for ab initio molecular dynamics simulations". Theoretical Chemistry Accounts: Theory, Computation, and Modeling. 103 (2): 124–140. doi:10.1007/s002140050523. S2CID 124305820.
- Lippert, Gerald; Hutter, Jürg; Parrinello, Michele (1997). "A hybrid Gaussian and plane wave density functional scheme". Molecular Physics. 92 (3): 477–487. Bibcode:1997MolPh..92..477L. doi:10.1080/002689797170220.
