= PM3 (chemistry) =

Method in computational chemistry

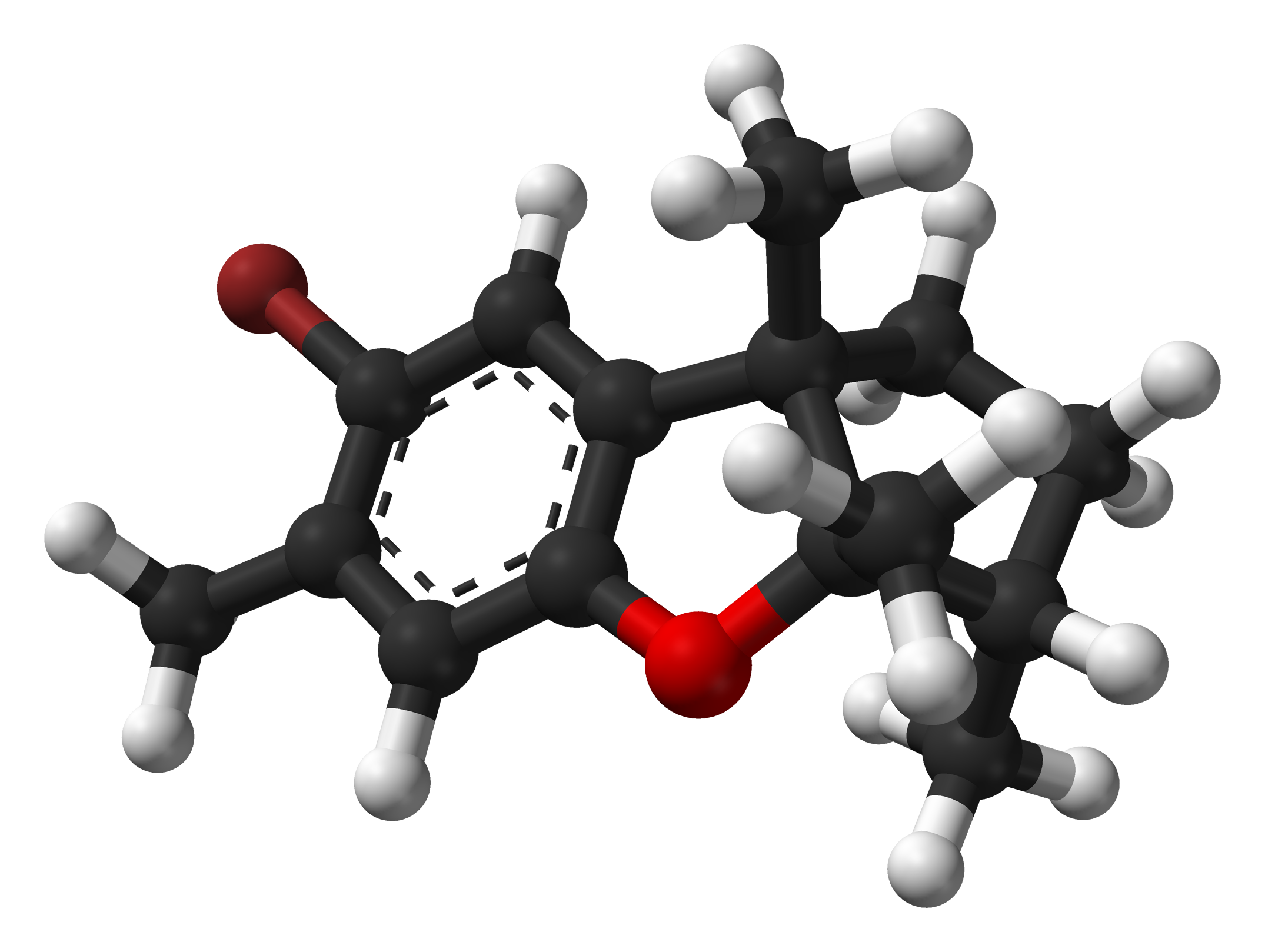
Ball-and-stick model of the aplysin molecule, C15H19BrO. Colour code: Carbon, C: black Hydrogen, H: white Bromine, Br: red-brown Oxygen, O: red Structure calculated with Spartan Student 4.1, using the PM3 semi-empirical method.

PM3, or Parametric Method 3, is a semi-empirical method for the quantum calculation of molecular electronic structure in computational chemistry. It is based on the Neglect of Differential Diatomic Overlap integral approximation.

The PM3 method uses the same formalism and equations as the AM1 method. The only differences are: 1) PM3 uses two Gaussian functions for the core repulsion function, instead of the variable number used by AM1 (which uses between one and four Gaussians per element); 2) the numerical values of the parameters are different. The other differences lie in the philosophy and methodology used during the parameterization: whereas AM1 takes some of the parameter values from spectroscopical measurements, PM3 treats them as optimizable values.

The method was developed by J. J. P. Stewart and first published in 1989. It is implemented in the MOPAC program (of which the older versions are public domain), along with the related RM1, AM1, MNDO and MINDO methods, and in several other programs such as Gaussian, CP2K, GAMESS (US), GAMESS (UK), PC GAMESS, Chem3D, AMPAC, ArgusLab, BOSS, and SPARTAN.

The original PM3 publication included parameters for the following elements: H, C, N, O, F, Al, Si, P, S, Cl, Br, and I.

The PM3 implementation in the SPARTAN program includes PM3tm with additional extensions for transition metals supporting calculations on Ca, Ti, V, Cr, Mn, Fe, Co, Ni, Cu, Zn, Zr, Mo, Tc, Ru, Rh, Pd, Hf, Ta, W, Re, Os, Ir, Pt, and Gd. Many other elements, mostly metals, have been parameterized in subsequent work.

A model for the PM3 calculation of lanthanide complexes, called Sparkle/PM3, was also introduced.
