= GAMESS =

GAMESS is a computational chemistry software program and stands for General Atomic and Molecular Electronic Structure System. The original Quantum Chemistry Program Exchange (QCPE) code of GAMESS split in 1981 and now the three version differ considerably:

- GAMESS (UK), a fork of the General Atomic and Molecular Electronic Structure System computational chemistry software program
- GAMESS (US), a fork of the General Atomic and Molecular Electronic Structure System computational chemistry software program
- Firefly (computer program) or PC GAMESS, an ab initio computational chemistry program based on GAMESS (US) sources
