= Chevron plot =

Graph of protein folding kinetics

A typical chevron plot observed in protein folding experiments.

A chevron plot is a way of representing protein folding kinetic data in the presence of varying concentrations of denaturant that disrupts the protein's native tertiary structure. The plot is known as "chevron" plot because of the canonical v, or chevron shape observed when the logarithm of the observed relaxation rate is plotted as a function of the denaturant concentration.

In a two-state system, folding and unfolding rates dominate the observed relaxation rates below and above the denaturation midpoint (Cm). This gives rise to the terminology of folding and unfolding arms for the limbs of the chevron. A priori information on the Cm of a protein can be obtained from equilibrium experiments. In fitting to a two-state model, the logarithm of the folding and unfolding rates is assumed to depend linearly on the denaturant concentration, thus resulting in the slopes m_{f} and m_{u}, called the folding and unfolding m-values, respectively (also called the kinetic m-values). The sum of the two rates is the observed relaxation rate. An agreement between equilibrium m-value and the absolute sum of the kinetic m-values is typically seen as a signature for two-state behavior. Most of the reported denaturation experiments have been carried out at 298 K with either urea or guanidinium chloride (GuHCl) as denaturants.

== Experimental methodology ==
To generate the folding limb of the chevron, the protein in a highly concentrated denaturant solution is diluted rapidly (in less than a millisecond) in an appropriate buffer to a particular denaturant concentration by means of a stopped flow apparatus. The relaxation to the new equilibrium is monitored by spectroscopic probes such as fluorescence or less frequently by circular dichroism (CD). The volume of the dilution is adjusted to obtain the relaxation rate at a specific denaturant concentration. The final protein concentration in the mixture is usually 1-20 μM, depending on the constraints imposed by the amplitude of relaxation and the signal-to-noise ratio. The unfolding limb is generated in a similar fashion by mixing denaturant-free protein with a concentrated denaturant solution in buffer. When the logarithm of these relaxation rates are plotted as a function of the final denaturant concentration, a chevron plot results.

The mixing of the solutions determines the dead time of the instrument, which is about a millisecond. Therefore, a stopped-flow apparatus can be employed only for proteins with a relaxation time of a few milliseconds. In cases where the relaxation time is shorter than the dead-time of the instrument, the experimental temperature is lowered (thus increasing the viscosity of water/buffer) to increase the relaxation time to a few milliseconds. On the other hand, for fast-folding proteins (i.e., those with a relaxation rate of 1 to 100 microseconds), pressure jump (dead time~few microseconds), temperature jump (T-jump; dead time~few nanoseconds) or continuous flow mixing (dead time~few microseconds), can be carried out at different denaturant concentrations to obtain a chevron plot.

== Chevron roll-overs ==
Though the limbs of the chevron are assumed to be linear with denaturant concentration, it is not always the case. Non-linearities are usually observed in the either both the limbs or one of them and are termed chevron roll-overs. The reason for such an observation is not clear. Many interpretations including on-pathway intermediates, dead-time limitations, transition state movements (Hammond effect), aggregation artifacts, downhill folding, and salt-induced Debye–Hückel effects have been proposed to explain this behavior. In many cases the folding limb roll-overs are ignored as they occur at low denaturant concentrations, and the data is fit to a two-state model with a linear dependence of the rates. The folding rates reported for such proteins in the absence of denaturants are therefore an over-estimation.

== See also ==
- Protein folding
- Denaturation (biochemistry)
- Denaturation midpoint
- Equilibrium unfolding
- Phi value analysis
