= Andreas Matouschek =

American biologist

- Born: Germany
- Education: Cambridge University (PhD, 1988-1992)
- Known for: Protein unfolding Proteasome
- Awards: Ely Lilly Award in Biological Chemistry (2003)
- Scientific career
- Fields: Biochemistry; Biophysics
- Workplaces: The University of Texas at Austin (2012-present); Northwestern University (1996-2012); University of Basel (1993-1996); University of Cambridge (1988-1993)
- Doctoral advisor: Sir Alan Fersht
- Website: www.matouscheklab.org

Andreas Matouschek is a biochemist at The University of Texas at Austin, where he is a professor in the College of Natural Sciences. His graduate work with Alan Fersht resulted in the seminal application of phi-value analysis to the study of barnase, a bacterial RNAse used in many protein folding studies. Development of phi value analysis in combination with extensive protein engineering enabled an understanding of the kinetic intermediates during protein folding of barnase. In subsequent postdoctoral work at the University of Basel, he studied how mitochondria refold proteins after importing them. In 1996, he moved to Northwestern University. In 2012, he moved to The University of Texas at Austin.

Matouschek currently studies the proteasome, the degradation machinery of eukaryotic cells, and the mechanisms by which the proteasome is able to unfold and translocate proteins.

== Scientific career ==
=== Cambridge (1988-1993) ===
At Cambridge, Matouschek was a graduate student under Sir Alan Fersht from 1988 to 1992. In 1989, he pioneered the use of phi value analysis in combination with protein engineering in order to study the transition state of the bacterial protein barnase. By engineering mutations in carefully chosen portions of barnase and computing the ratio between the energetic destabilization introduced by a mutation in the transition state of barnase versus that of the same mutation to barnase's native state, he was able to gain insight about the transition state of barnase and its folding pathway. After receiving his PhD in 1992, Matouschek continued his work with Fersht, serving as a research fellow at the Centre for Protein Engineering for an additional year.

=== University of Basel (1993-1996) ===
At the University of Basel, Matoschek was a postdoctorate fellow under Gottfried (Jeff) Schatz.

=== The University of Texas at Austin (2012-present) ===
Matouschek was recruited to The University of Texas at Austin in 2012.
