= Centre for Protein Engineering =

English research unit

The MRC Centre for Protein Engineering (or CPE) was a pioneering research unit in Cambridge, England, with a main focus on the structure, stability and activity of proteins and engineering of antibodies.

Centre for Protein Engineering was established in 1990 as one of the MRC's first interdisciplinary research centres and one of the first research laboratories to bring together molecular biology, molecular genetics, biophysics and structural biology into one cohesive unit. It was formed around the research of two prominent scientists who invented protein engineering, Sir Alan Fersht and Sir Greg Winter. Sir Alan Fersht was Director of the MRC CPE from 1990 to 2010, with Greg Winter as Deputy Director. Both, Sir Alan Fersht and Sir Greg Winter were knighted in recognition of their work and for their outstanding contributions to science.

From 1990 to 2010 the unit has been extremely successful, both academically and commercially. All of Sir Alan's work on protein folding and much of Sir Greg's pioneering work to humanise antibodies was carried out at CPE. For example, Cambridge Antibody Technology was a biotechnology company founded by Sir Greg Winter in 1989 that was bought for £702 million in 2006 by AstraZeneca.

Another successful project that was started at CPE and maintained there until 2010 was the Structural Classification of Proteins database (or SCOP). Over the years SCOP has supported the development of computational tools and contributed to the understanding of protein repertoire, of how proteins relate to each other and how their structures and functions evolved.

The MRC Centre for Protein Engineering closed its doors at the end of September 2010, following the retirement of its director, Sir Alan Fersht. Nearly all of the CPE staff, including those maintaining the Structural Classification of Proteins database, and its infrastructure were incorporated into the MRC Laboratory of Molecular Biology (LMB).

== Notable alumni ==
- Cyrus Chothia
- Jane Clarke
- Alan Fersht
- Tim Hubbard
- Andreas Matouschek
- Alexey Murzin
- Mikael Oliveberg
- Luis Serrano
- Dan Tawfik
- Gregory Winter
