= Jane Clarke (scientist) =

English biochemist and academic

Jane Clarke FRS FRSC FMedSci
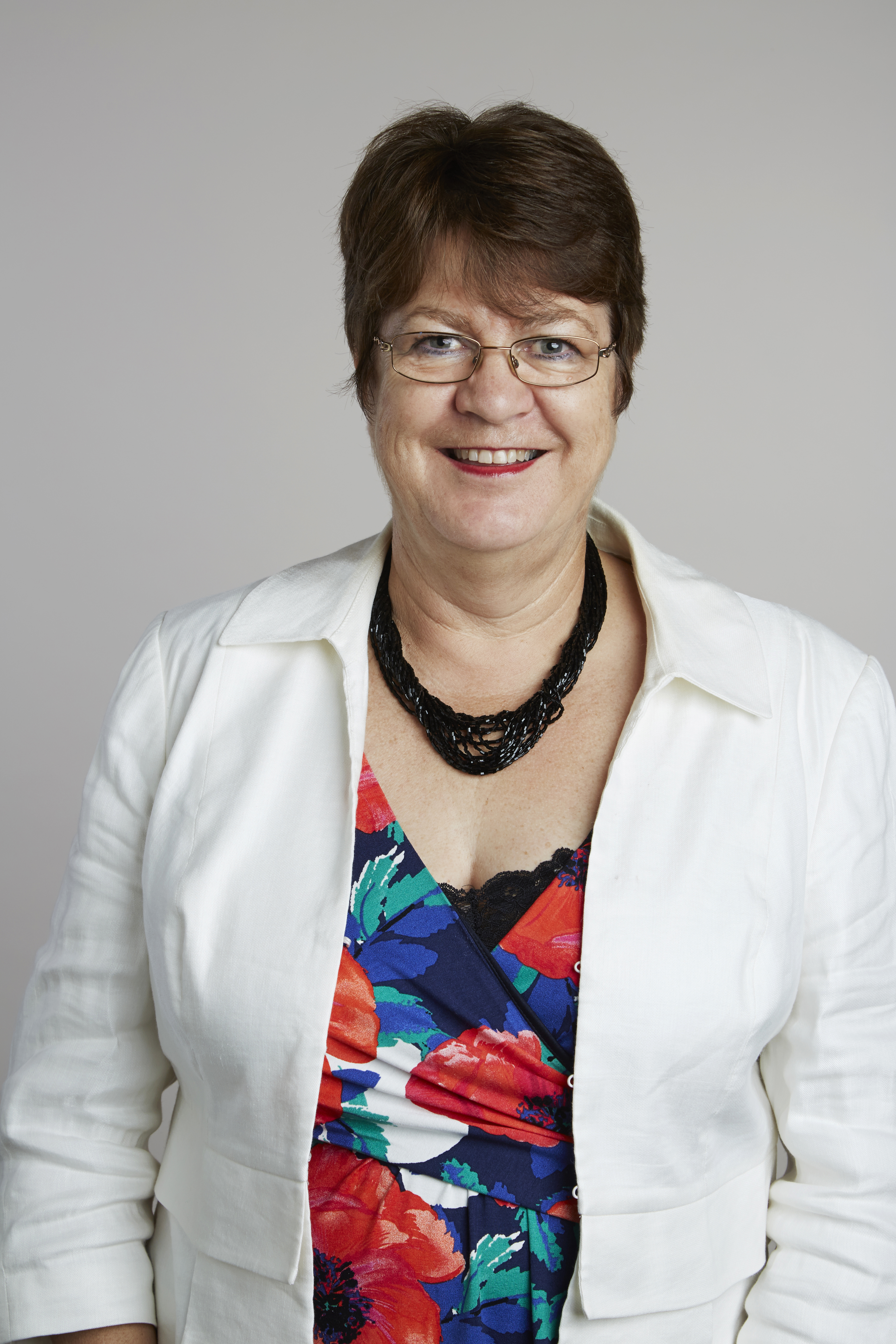
- Clarke in 2015
- Born: Jane Morgan; 10 September 1950 (age 76); London, England
- Education: University of York; Georgia Institute of Technology; University of Cambridge
- Spouse: Christopher Clarke (m. 1973)
- Awards: US Genomics Award (2010)
- Scientific career
- Fields: Biophysics; Biochemistry; Protein folding
- Workplaces: Trinity Hall, Cambridge; Wolfson College, Cambridge
- Thesis: Studies of Disulphide Mutants of Barnase (1993)
- Doctoral advisor: Alan Fersht
- Website: www-clarke.ch.cam.ac.uk

Jane Clarke (née Morgan; born 1950) is a British biochemist and academic. She served as President of Wolfson College, Cambridge from October 2017 to June 2024. She is also Professor of Molecular Biophysics, a Wellcome Trust Senior Research Fellow in the Department of Chemistry at the University of Cambridge. She was previously a Fellow of Trinity Hall, Cambridge. In 2023, she was elected to the National Academy of Sciences.

== Early life and education ==
Clarke was born Jane Morgan in London on 10 September 1950. She was educated at the University of York where she graduated with a first-class honours degree in biochemistry in 1972. She went on to study for a Postgraduate Certificate in Education (PGCE) at the University of Cambridge in 1973. Clarke was a science teacher in several secondary schools, and a Head of Science at Northumberland Park School, Tottenham, from 1973 to 1986.

Clarke married Christopher Clarke in 1973 with whom she would go on to have one son and one daughter. He obtained a job in the United States and the family moved there. Since Clarke was unable to work as a teacher, through not having appropriate qualifications she decided to update her scientific knowledge through a Master of Science degree in applied biology, awarded in 1990 from the Georgia Institute of Technology. This experience made her decide to seek a career in research related to proteins. She was subsequently awarded a Doctor of Philosophy degree in 1993 for investigations of Bacterial Ribonuclease (Barnase) from the University of Cambridge supervised by Alan Fersht.

== Research and career ==
Clarke was appointed a Wellcome Trust Senior Research Fellow in 2001, a Professor of Molecular Biophysics in 2009 and a Fellow of Trinity Hall, Cambridge, in 2010. On 1 October 2017, she became the President of Wolfson College, Cambridge.

Clarke's research investigates protein folding, in particular:

1. Studies of structurally related proteins
2. Multidomain proteins: effects of sequence on folding and misfolding
3. Folding and assembly: intrinsically disordered proteins

Clarke's research has been funded by the Wellcome Trust, Medical Research Council (MRC) and the Biotechnology and Biological Sciences Research Council (BBSRC).

She has been the author or co-author of over 100 scientific papers and book chapters including:

- Sigrid Milles and 11 other authors including Jane Clarke (2015) Plasticity of an ultrafast interaction between nucleoporins and nuclear transport receptors. Cell 163 734–745
- Madeleine B. Borgia, Alessandro Borgia, six others and Jane Clarke (2011) Single-molecule fluorescence reveals sequence-specific misfolding in multidomain proteins. Nature 474 662–665
- Alessandro Borgia, Philip M. Williams and Jane Clarke (2008) Single-molecule studies of protein folding. Annual Review of Biochemistry 77 101–125
- Jung-Hoon Han, Sarah Batey, Adrian A. Nickson, Sarah A. Teichmann and Jane Clarke (2007) The folding and evolution of multidomain proteins. Nature Reviews Molecular Cell Biology 8 319–330

=== Awards and honours ===
In 2010, Clarke was awarded the US Genomics award from the Biophysical Society. Clarke was also elected a Fellow of the Royal Society of Chemistry (FRSC) in 2015, and a Fellow of the Academy of Medical Sciences (FMedSci) in 2013. Her nomination for the Academy of Medical Sciences in 2013 reads:

Jane Clarke is a distinguished biophysical chemist at the University of Cambridge. She is recognised internationally for her multidisciplinary studies that have advanced the understanding of protein folding and misfolding. She pioneered the application of protein engineering techniques together with single molecule force spectroscopy and simulations to investigate the effect of force on proteins. For this she was awarded the Biophysical Society U.S Genomics Award for Outstanding Investigator in the field of Single Molecule Biology in 2010; at the time, the only non-US and still the only female recipient of this prestigious award.

Clarke was elected a Fellow of the Royal Society (FRS) in 2015. Her certificate of election reads:

Jane Clarke is distinguished for the rigorous physical chemistry approaches she has adapted and applied to understand protein folding and misfolding. Her fundamental studies revealed the presence of both parallel pathways and frustration in the energy landscape of apparently simple proteins. Most significantly, she has made very important advances in the study of multi-domain systems. From her discovery that aggregation and misfolding are determined by sequence similarity, through to her seminal studies combining force spectroscopy and protein engineering to elucidate mechanical unfolding energy landscapes, she has transformed our understanding of the evolution, folding and energetics of multidomain proteins.

In 2021 she spoke about her career in the BBC Radio 4 programme The Life Scientific.
