= Barnase =

Bacterial ribonuclease protein

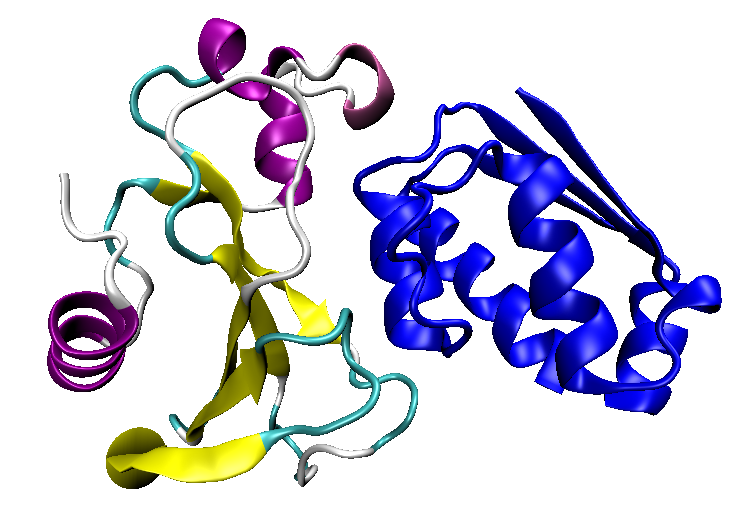
- The tightly bound complex between barnase and its inhibitor barstar. Barnase is colored by secondary structure and barstar is colored in blue.

Identifiers
- Symbol: Barnase
- PDB: 1BRS More structures
- UniProt: P00648

Other data
- EC number: 3.1.27.-
Search for
- Structures: Swiss-model
- Domains: InterPro

Barnase (a portmanteau of "BActerial" "RiboNucleASE") is a bacterial protein that consists of 110 amino acids and has ribonuclease activity. It is synthesized and secreted by the bacterium Bacillus amyloliquefaciens, but is lethal to the cell when expressed without its inhibitor barstar. The inhibitor binds to and occludes the ribonuclease active site, preventing barnase from damaging the cell's RNA after it has been synthesized but before it has been secreted. The barnase/barstar complex is noted for its extraordinarily tight protein-protein binding, with an on-rate of 10^{8} s^{−1} M^{−1}.

== Protein folding studies ==
Barnase has no disulfide bonds, nor does it require divalent cations or non-peptide components to fold. This simplicity, in combination with its reversible folding transition, means that barnase has been extensively studied in order to understand how proteins fold. The folding of barnase has been extensively studied in the laboratory of Alan Fersht, who used it as the test case in developing a method of characterizing protein folding transition states known as phi value analysis.

== Active site and catalytic mechanism ==
Barnase catalyzes hydrolysis at diribonucleotide GpN sites. Cleavage occurs in two steps using a general acid-base mechanism: a cyclic intermediate is formed during the first transesterification step, which is then hydrolysed to release the cleaved RNA. The two most important residues involved in catalysis are Glu73 and His102, which are both essential for enzymatic activity. Glu73 is the general base whilst His102 is the general acid. Although it is not directly involved in acid-base catalysis, Lys27 is also critical for activity; it has been implicated in transition-state substrate binding.

== See also ==
- Toxin-antitoxin system
