= Equilibrium unfolding =

Biochemistry process

In biochemistry, equilibrium unfolding is the process of unfolding a protein or RNA molecule by gradually changing its environment, such as by changing the temperature or pressure, pH, adding chemical denaturants, or applying force as with an atomic force microscope tip. If the equilibrium was maintained at all steps, the process theoretically should be reversible during equilibrium folding. Equilibrium unfolding can be used to determine the thermodynamic stability of the protein or RNA structure, i.e. free energy difference between the folded and unfolded states.

== Theoretical background ==
In its simplest form, equilibrium unfolding assumes that the molecule may belong to only two thermodynamic states, the folded state (typically denoted N for "native" state) and the unfolded state (typically denoted U). This "all-or-none" model of protein folding was first proposed by Tim Anson in 1945, but is believed to hold only for small, single structural domains of proteins (Jackson, 1998); larger domains and multi-domain proteins often exhibit intermediate states. As usual in statistical mechanics, these states correspond to ensembles of molecular conformations, not just one conformation.

The molecule may transition between the native and unfolded states according to a simple kinetic model

N ⇌ U

with rate constants $k_{f}$ and $k_{u}$ for the folding ($\ce{U -> N}$) and unfolding ($\ce{N -> U}$) reactions, respectively. The dimensionless equilibrium constant $K_{eq} \ \stackrel{\mathrm{def}}{=}\ \frac{k_{u}}{k_{f}} = \frac{\left[\ce U \right]_{eq}}{\left[\ce N \right]_{eq}}$ can be used to determine the conformational stability $\Delta G^o$ by the equation

$$\Delta G^ o = -RT \ln K_{eq}$$

where $R$ is the gas constant and $T$ is the absolute temperature in kelvin. Thus, $\Delta G^o$ is positive if the unfolded state is less stable (i.e., disfavored) relative to the native state.

The most direct way to measure the conformational stability $\Delta G^o$ of a molecule with two-state folding is to measure its kinetic rate constants $k_{f}$ and $k_{u}$ under the solution conditions of interest. However, since protein folding is typically completed in milliseconds, such measurements can be difficult to perform, usually requiring expensive stopped flow or (more recently) continuous-flow mixers to provoke folding with a high time resolution. Dual polarisation interferometry is an emerging technique to directly measure conformational change and $\Delta G^o$.

== Chemical denaturation ==
In the less extensive technique of equilibrium unfolding, the fractions of folded and unfolded molecules (denoted as $p_{N}$ and $p_{U}$, respectively) are measured as the solution conditions are gradually changed from those favoring the native state to those favoring the unfolded state, e.g., by adding a denaturant such as guanidinium hydrochloride or urea. (In equilibrium folding, the reverse process is carried out.) Given that the fractions must sum to one and their ratio must be given by the Boltzmann factor, we have

$$p_{N} = \frac{1}{1 + e^{-\Delta G/RT}}$$

$$p_{U} = 1 - p_{N} = \frac{e^{-\Delta G/RT}}{1 + e^{-\Delta G/RT}} = \frac{1}{1 + e^{\Delta G/RT}}$$

Protein stabilities are typically found to vary linearly with the denaturant concentration. A number of models have been proposed to explain this observation prominent among them being the denaturant binding model, solvent-exchange model (both by John Schellman) and the Linear Extrapolation Model (LEM; by Nick Pace). All of the models assume that only two thermodynamic states are populated/de-populated upon denaturation. They could be extended to interpret more complicated reaction schemes.

The denaturant binding model assumes that there are specific but independent sites on the protein molecule (folded or unfolded) to which the denaturant binds with an effective (average) binding constant k. The equilibrium shifts towards the unfolded state at high denaturant concentrations as it has more binding sites for the denaturant relative to the folded state ($\Delta n$). In other words, the increased number of potential sites exposed in the unfolded state is seen as the reason for denaturation transitions. An elementary treatment results in the following functional form:

$$\Delta G = \Delta G_{w} - RT  \Delta n  \ln \left(1 +  k [D] \right)$$

where $\Delta G_{w}$ is the stability of the protein in water and [D] is the denaturant concentration. Thus the analysis of denaturation data with this model requires 7 parameters: $\Delta G_{w}$,$\Delta n$, k, and the slopes and intercepts of the folded and unfolded state baselines.

The solvent exchange model (also called the ‘weak binding model’ or ‘selective solvation’) of Schellman invokes the idea of an equilibrium between the water molecules bound to independent sites on protein and the denaturant molecules in solution. It has the form:

$$\Delta G = \Delta G_{w} - RT  \Delta n \ln \left(1 +  (K-1)  X_{D} \right)$$

where $K$ is the equilibrium constant for the exchange reaction and $X_{d}$ is the mole-fraction of the denaturant in solution. This model tries to answer the question of whether the denaturant molecules actually bind to the protein or they seem to be bound just because denaturants occupy about 20-30% of the total solution volume at high concentrations used in experiments, i.e. non-specific effects – and hence the term ‘weak binding’. As in the denaturant-binding model, fitting to this model also requires 7 parameters. One common theme obtained from both these models is that the binding constants (in the molar scale) for urea and guanidinium hydrochloride are small: ~ 0.2 $M^{-1}$ for urea and 0.6 $M^{-1}$ for GuHCl.

Intuitively, the difference in the number of binding sites between the folded and unfolded states is directly proportional to the differences in the accessible surface area. This forms the basis for the LEM which assumes a simple linear dependence of stability on the denaturant concentration. The resulting slope of the plot of stability versus the denaturant concentration is called the m-value. In pure mathematical terms, m-value is the derivative of the change in stabilization free energy upon the addition of denaturant. However, a strong correlation between the accessible surface area (ASA) exposed upon unfolding, i.e. difference in the ASA between the unfolded and folded state of the studied protein (dASA), and the m-value has been documented by Pace and co-workers. In view of this observation, the m-values are typically interpreted as being proportional to the dASA. There is no physical basis for the LEM and it is purely empirical, though it is widely used in interpreting solvent-denaturation data. It has the general form:

$$\Delta G = m \left( [D]_{1/2} - [D] \right)$$

where the slope $m$ is called the "m-value"(> 0 for the above definition) and $\left[ D \right]_{1/2}$ (also called C_{m}) represents the denaturant concentration at which 50% of the molecules are folded (the denaturation midpoint of the transition, where $p_{N} = p_{U} = 1/2$).

In practice, the observed experimental data at different denaturant concentrations are fit to a two-state model with this functional form for $\Delta G$, together with linear baselines for the folded and unfolded states. The $m$ and $\left[ D \right]_{1/2}$ are two fitting parameters, along with four others for the linear baselines (slope and intercept for each line); in some cases, the slopes are assumed to be zero, giving four fitting parameters in total. The conformational stability $\Delta G$ can be calculated for any denaturant concentration (including the stability at zero denaturant) from the fitted parameters $m$ and $\left[ D \right]_{1/2}$. When combined with kinetic data on folding, the m-value can be used to roughly estimate the amount of buried hydrophobic surface in the folding transition state.

=== Structural probes ===
Unfortunately, the probabilities $p_{N}$ and $p_{U}$ cannot be measured directly. Instead, we assay the relative population of folded molecules using various structural probes, e.g., absorbance at 287 nm (which reports on the solvent exposure of tryptophan and tyrosine), far-ultraviolet circular dichroism (180-250 nm, which reports on the secondary structure of the protein backbone), dual polarisation interferometry (which reports the molecular size and fold density) and near-ultraviolet fluorescence (which reports on changes in the environment of tryptophan and tyrosine). However, nearly any probe of folded structure will work; since the measurement is taken at equilibrium, there is no need for high time resolution. Thus, measurements can be made of NMR chemical shifts, intrinsic viscosity, solvent exposure (chemical reactivity) of side chains such as cysteine, backbone exposure to proteases, and various hydrodynamic measurements.

To convert these observations into the probabilities $p_{N}$ and $p_{U}$, one generally assumes that the observable $A$ adopts one of two values, $A_{N}$ or $A_{U}$, corresponding to the native or unfolded state, respectively. Hence, the observed value equals the linear sum

$$A = A_{N} p_{N} + A_{U} p_{U}$$

By fitting the observations of $A$ under various solution conditions to this functional form, one can estimate $A_{N}$ and $A_{U}$, as well as the parameters of $\Delta G$. The fitting variables $A_{N}$ and $A_{U}$ are sometimes allowed to vary linearly with the solution conditions, e.g., temperature or denaturant concentration, when the asymptotes of $A$ are observed to vary linearly under strongly folding or strongly unfolding conditions.

== Thermal denaturation ==
Assuming a two state denaturation as stated above, one can derive the fundamental thermodynamic parameters namely, $\Delta H$, $\Delta S$ and $\Delta G$ provided one has knowledge on the $\Delta C_p$ of the system under investigation.

The thermodynamic observables of denaturation can be described by the following equations:

$$\begin{align}
\Delta H(T)&=\Delta H(T_d)+ \int_{T_d}^T \Delta C_p dT
\\
&=\Delta H(T_d)+ \Delta C_p[T-T_d]
\\
\Delta S(T)&=\frac{\Delta H(T_d)}{T_d}+ \int_{T_d}^T \Delta C_p d \ln T
\\
&=\frac{\Delta H(T_d)}{T_d}+ \Delta C_p \ln \frac{T}{T_d}
\\
\Delta G(T)&=\Delta H -T \Delta S
\\
&=\Delta H(T_d) \frac{T_d-T}{T_d}+ \int_{T_d}^T \Delta C_p dT - T\int_{T_d}^T \Delta C_p d \ln T
\\
&=\Delta H(T_d)\left(1-\frac{T}{T_d}\right) - \Delta C_p\left[T_d -T +T \ln \left(\frac{T}{T_d}\right)\right]
\end{align}$$

where $\ \Delta H$, $\ \Delta S$ and $\ \Delta G$ indicate the enthalpy, entropy and Gibbs free energy of unfolding under a constant pH and pressure. The temperature, $\ T$ is varied to probe the thermal stability of the system and $\ T_d$ is the temperature at which half of the molecules in the system are unfolded. The last equation is known as the Gibbs–Helmholtz equation.

=== Determining the heat capacity of proteins ===
In principle one can calculate all the above thermodynamic observables from a single differential scanning calorimetry thermogram of the system assuming that the $\ce{\Delta C_p}$ is independent of the temperature. However, it is difficult to obtain accurate values for $\ce{\Delta C_p}$ this way. More accurately, the $\ce{\Delta C_p}$ can be derived from the variations in $\ce{\Delta H(T_d)}$ vs. $\ce{T_d}$ which can be achieved from measurements with slight variations in pH or protein concentration. The slope of the linear fit is equal to the $\ce{\Delta C_p}$. Note that any non-linearity of the datapoints indicates that $\Delta C_p$ is probably not independent of the temperature.

Alternatively, the $\ce{\Delta C_p}$ can also be estimated from the calculation of the accessible surface area (ASA) of a protein prior and after thermal denaturation as follows:

$$\ce{\Delta ASA} = \ce{ASA_{unfolded}} - \ce{ASA_{native}}$$

For proteins that have a known 3d structure, the $\ce{ASA_{native}}$ can be calculated through computer programs such as Deepview (also known as swiss PDB viewer). The $\ce{ASA_{unfolded}}$ can be calculated from tabulated values of each amino acid through the semi-empirical equation:

$$\ce{ASA_{unfolded}} = \left( a_\ce{polar} \times \ce{ASA_{polar}}\right) + \left( a_\ce{aromatic} \times \ce{ASA_{aromatic}} \right) + \left( a_\ce{nonpolar} \times \ce{ASA_{nonpolar}}\right)$$

where the subscripts polar, non-polar and aromatic indicate the parts of the 20 naturally occurring amino acids.

Finally for proteins, there is a linear correlation between $\ce{\Delta ASA}$ and $\ce{\Delta C_p}$ through the following equation:

$$\ce{\Delta C_p} = 0.61 \times \ce{\Delta ASA}$$

=== Assessing two-state unfolding ===
Furthermore, one can assess whether the folding proceeds according to a two-state unfolding as described above. This can be done with differential scanning calorimetry by comparing the calorimetric enthalpy of denaturation i.e. the area under the peak, $A_\text{peak}$ to the van 't Hoff enthalpy described as follows:

$$\Delta H_{vH}(T)= -R\frac{d\ln K}{dT^{-1}}$$

at $T=T_d$ the $\Delta H_{vH}(T_d)$ can be described as:

$$\Delta H_{vH}(T_d)= \frac{RT_d^2 \Delta C_p^{\max}}{A_\text{peak}}$$

When a two-state unfolding is observed the $A_\text{peak}=\Delta H_{vH}(T_d)$. The $\Delta C_p^{\max}$ is the height of the heat capacity peak.

== Generalization to protein complexes and multi-domain proteins ==
Using the above principles, equations that relate a global protein signal, corresponding to the folding states in equilibrium, and the variable value of a denaturing agent, either temperature or a chemical molecule, have been derived for homomeric and heteromeric proteins, from monomers to trimers and potentially tetramers. These equations provide a robust theoretical basis for measuring the stability of complex proteins, and for comparing the stabilities of wild type and mutant proteins. Such equations cannot be derived for pentamers of higher oligomers because of mathematical limitations (Abel–Ruffini theorem).
