= Alan Fersht =

British chemist (born 1943)

Professor Sir Alan Fersht FRS FMedSci
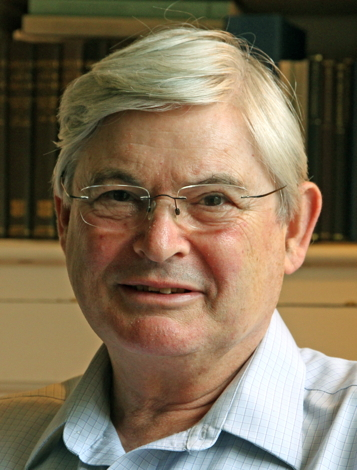
- Born: Alan Roy Fersht; 21 April 1943 (age 83); London, England
- Education: Sir George Monoux Grammar School, University of Cambridge
- Known for: Protein folding, Phi value analysis, Protein engineering, nucleation-condensation mechanism, double-sieve model of error correction, aminoacyl tRNA synthetases, specificity constant $k_\text{cat}/K_\mathrm{m}$
- Spouse: Marilyn Persell (m. 1966)
- Awards: Knight Bachelor (2003); Gabor Medal (1991); Davy Medal (1998); Royal Medal (2008); Copley Medal (2020)
- Scientific career
- Fields: Enzyme catalysis; Protein folding; p53; Cancer
- Workplaces: Laboratory of Molecular Biology; University of Cambridge; Imperial College, London; Gonville and Caius College, Cambridge
- Thesis: Intramolecular Catalysis of Ester Hydrolysis (1968)
- Doctoral students: Jane Clarke; Sophie E. Jackson, Andreas Matouschek

Sir Alan Roy Fersht (born 21 April 1943) is a British chemist at the MRC Laboratory of Molecular Biology, Cambridge, and an Emeritus Professor in the Department of Chemistry at the University of Cambridge. He was Master of Gonville and Caius College, Cambridge from 2012 to 2018. He works at the interface of chemistry, molecular biology and biophysics on protein science, and is sometimes described as a founder of protein engineering.

== Early life and education ==
Fersht was born on 21 April 1943 in Hackney, London, and grew up in Chingford, east London. His father, Philip, was a ladies' tailor and his mother, Betty, a dressmaker. His grandparents were Jewish immigrants from Poland, Lithuania and Belarus. He was educated at Sir George Monoux Grammar School, an all-boys grammar school in Walthamstow, London. He was a keen chess player and was the Essex County Junior champion in 1961. He was awarded a State Scholarship to read Natural Sciences at Gonville and Caius College, Cambridge, where he obtained First Class in Pt I of the Natural Sciences Tripos in 1964, First Class in Pt II (Chemistry) in 1965 and was awarded his PhD degree in 1968. He was President of the University of Cambridge Chess Club in 1964–65 and awarded a half blue in 1965.

== Career and research ==
He spent a post-doctoral year (1968–1969) at Brandeis University working under William Jencks. He returned to Cambridge in 1969 as a group leader at the MRC Laboratory of Molecular Biology until 1977 and a junior research fellow at Jesus College, Cambridge until 1972. Fersht was Wolfson Research Professor of the Royal Society and Professor of Biological Chemistry at Imperial College London from 1978 to 1988. He spent a sabbatical year at Stanford University on an Eleanor Roosevelt Fellowship of the American Cancer Society with Arthur Kornberg (1978–79). Fersht was Herchel Smith Professor of Organic Chemistry at Cambridge from 1988 to 2010. He was the Director of the Cambridge Centre for Protein Engineering from 1990 to 2010 when, on reaching the retirement age, he became an Emeritus Group Leader at the MRC Laboratory of Molecular Biology. He is a Life Fellow of Gonville and Caius College.

Fersht studied for his PhD intramolecular catalysis in the hydrolysis of aspirin as a model for catalysis by enzymes. He was recruited by David Mervyn Blow and Max Perutz at the MRC Laboratory of Molecular Biology to work on the mechanism of the enzymes that were being solved there. He became a self-taught enzymologist. According to Athel Cornish-Bowden, the last major advance in understanding steady-state kinetics was made by Fersht, who introduced for the first time a meaningful definition of specificity. Fersht pointed out that $k_\text{cat}/K_\mathrm{m}$ of Michaelis-Menten kinetics is the parameter that measures the capacity of an enzyme to discriminate between substrates that are available simultaneously, and so it provides the only meaningful physiological definition of specificity. For that reason, the International Union of Biochemistry and Molecular Biology has recommended the name specificity constant for this ratio.

Fersht used measurements of $k_\text{cat}/K_\mathrm{m}$ to quantify the role of binding energies in catalysis and specificity, particularly in the fidelity of selection of amino acids during protein biosynthesis by the aminoacyl-tRNA synthetases, where he formulated the double-sieve editing mechanism. Fersht was one of the first classical enzymologists to use Recombinant DNA technology, which he learned in the laboratory of Arthur Kornberg, while measuring the fidelity of DNA replication from kinetics of mutagenesis in vivo. In 1982, he began a collaboration with Sir Gregory Winter in which they were the first to engineer a mutation in a protein of known structure, the tyrosyl-tRNA synthetase. Fersht went on to pioneer protein engineering as a tool for analysing protein structure and mechanism while Winter as a tool for antibody engineering. From 1990-2010, they were respectively the Director and Deputy Director of the Centre for Protein Engineering. Fersht showed that Free-energy relationships can be applied to analyse non-covalent interactions in transition states of enzyme-catalysed reactions and infer their structures in an analogous procedure to physical chemical methods for transition states in covalent reactions by measuring changes in the kinetics and thermodynamics on small changes in the structure of reagents. This procedure of studying protein engineered mutants, named Phi value analysis, was then applied to inferring the structure of transition states of protein folding and elucidating mechanisms of protein folding. Phi value analysis of the folding of the single-domain protein chymotrypsin inhibitor 2 uncovered a fundamental folding mechanism, “nucleation-condensation” whereby the folding chain collapses in an extended transition state around a concomitantly formed nucleus. His interests also include protein misfolding, disease and cancer.

=== Selected publications ===
- Structure and Mechanism in Protein Science: A Guide to Enzyme Catalysis and Protein Folding
- The Selected Papers of Sir Alan Fersht: Development of Protein Engineering

=== Awards and honours ===
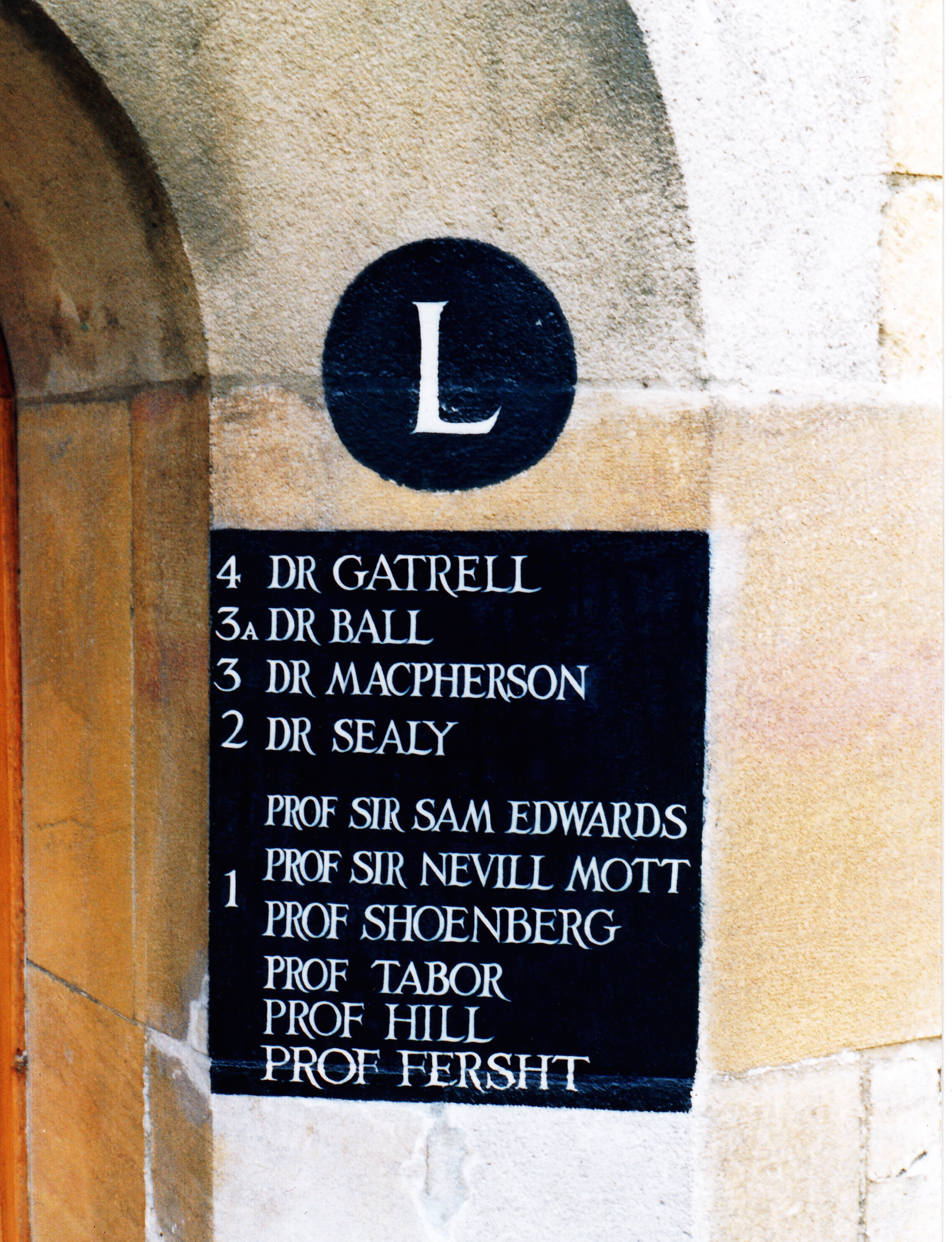
Scientists sharing L1 in Caius Court, Gonville and Caius College, Cambridge, taken in 1994 (Nevill Mott, Samuel Frederick Edwards, David Tabor, David Shoenberg, Rodney Hill, and Alan Fersht)

Fersht was elected a Fellow of the Royal Society (FRS) in 1983. The Royal Society awarded him the Gabor Medal in 1991 for molecular biology, in 1998 the Davy Medal for chemistry, in 2008 the Royal Medal and in 2020 the Copley Medal for his development and application of methods of protein engineering to provide descriptions of protein folding pathways at atomic resolution. He is an International Member of the United States National Academy of Sciences, a Foreign Member of the American Philosophical Society, a Foreign Member of the Accademia dei Lincei, Member of Academia Europaea, an Honorary Foreign Member of the American Academy of Arts and Sciences and a Fellow of the Academy of Medical Sciences (FMedSci). His nomination for the Royal Society reads:

Distinguished for work on mechanisms of enzyme catalysis, especially by stopped and quenched flow methods. He showed that a slow relaxation of chymotrypsin was not a chemical step on the reaction pathway, but a pH-dependent isomerisation between active and inactive forms, and investigated the energetics and equilibria of the transition. He elucidated the leaving-group specificity, leading to a detailed structural interpretation which showed the energetics of "strain" at the binding site. Another experiment dispelled final doubts about the role of a tetrahedral intermediate. More recently Fersht has studied a more complex group of enzymes, the aminoacyl tRNA synthetases. He demonstrated that their precise specificity depends on consecutive independent recognition steps, and under appropriate conditions he trapped a transiently discharged aminoacyl tRNA. Fersht has shown how binding energy can be used to enhance either specificity or rate in an enzymatic reaction, leading to a demonstration of thermodynamic limitations on mechanisms of the "induced fit" type.

Fersht holds honorary doctorates from Uppsala University (1999), Vrije Universiteit Brussel (1999), Weizmann Institute of Science (2004), Hebrew University of Jerusalem (2006), and Aarhus University (2008). He is an Honorary Fellow of Darwin College, Cambridge (2014) and Jesus College, Cambridge (2017).

Fersht has received many prizes and medals including: the FEBS Anniversary Prize; Novo Biotechnology Award; Charmian Medal of the Royal Society of Chemistry; Max Tishler Lecture and Prize Harvard University; The Datta Lectureship and Medal of the Federation of European Biochemical Societies; Jubilee Lecture and the Harden Medal of the Biochemical Society; Feldberg Foundation Prize, Distinguished Service Award, Miami Nature Biotechnology Winter Symposium; Christian B. Anfinsen Award of the Protein Society; Natural Products Award of the Royal Society of Chemistry, Stein and Moore Award of the Protein Society; Bader Award of the American Chemical Society; Kaj Ulrik Linderstrøm-Lang Prize and Medal; Bijvoet Medal of the Bijvoet Center for Biomolecular Research of Utrecht University in 2008 and the Gilbert N. Lewis Medal University of California, Berkeley, and the Wilhelm Exner Medal in 2009.

In 2003 he was knighted for his pioneering work on protein science. His citation on election to the Academy of Medical Sciences reads:

Herchel Smith Professor of Organic Chemistry at the MRC Centre for Protein Engineering, Cambridge, Sir Alan is one of the world's leading protein scientists. He was elected to the Royal Society in his late 30s in 1983 for his work illuminating enzymic catalysis and how enzymes attain high fidelity in the translation of the genetic code. Subsequently he was one of the pioneering founders of protein engineering, developing it as an analytical procedure for understanding interactions in proteins and enzyme catalysis. This radical new approach unravelled the relationships between the structure, activity and function of proteins. The full power of his methods became apparent in his seminal and far reaching contributions to the field of protein folding and stability. These studies opened the way to development of novel therapies in cancer and other diseases. He currently works on mutations that affect the stability and activity of the tumour suppressor p53 and how mutants may be "rescued" by small molecule drugs. His contributions have been widely recognised nationally and internationally by prizes for both chemistry and molecular biology, and by memberships of foreign academies.

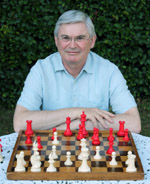

== Personal life ==
Fersht married Marilyn Persell in 1966 and has one son and one daughter. His recreations include chess, horology and wildlife photography.

Academic offices
Preceded by Sir Christopher Hum	Master of Gonville and Caius College, Cambridge; 2012–2018	Succeeded by Pippa Rogerson
Awards
Preceded by Noreen Murray	Gabor Medal; 1991	Succeeded by Charles Weissmann
Preceded by Jean-Marie Lehn	Davy Medal; 1998	Succeeded by Malcolm H. Chisholm
Preceded by Jim Feast	Royal Medal; 2008; With: Sir Philip Cohen and Robert E. M. Hedges	Succeeded by Chris Dobson
Preceded by Cyril Hilsum	Royal Medal; 2008; With: Sir Philip Cohen and Robert E. M. Hedges	Succeeded by Ron Laskey
Preceded by Tomas Lindahl	Royal Medal; 2008; With: Sir Philip Cohen and Robert E. M. Hedges	Succeeded by C. N. R. Rao
Preceded by Zdeněk P. Bažant	Wilhelm Exner Medal; 2009; With: Christian Wandrey	Succeeded by Bertil Andersson
Preceded by Wolfgang Knoll	Wilhelm Exner Medal; 2009; With: Christian Wandrey	Succeeded by Ada Yonath
