= Stopped-flow =

Physical chemistry

Stopped-flow is one of a number of methods of studying the kinetics of reactions in solution. It is ideal for studying chemical reactions with a typical dead time on the order of 1 millisecond. In the simplest form of the technique, the solutions of two reactants are rapidly mixed by being forced through a mixing chamber, on emerging from which the mixed fluid passes through an optical observation cell. At some point in time, the flow is suddenly stopped, and the reaction is monitored using a suitable spectroscopic probe, such as absorbance, fluorescence or fluorescence polarization. The change in spectroscopic signal as a function of time is recorded, and the rate constants that define the reaction kinetics can then be obtained by fitting the data using a suitable model.

Stopped-flow as an experimental technique was introduced by Britton Chance and extended by Quentin Gibson. Other techniques, such as the temperature-jump method, are available for much faster processes.

== Description of the Method ==
=== Introduction ===
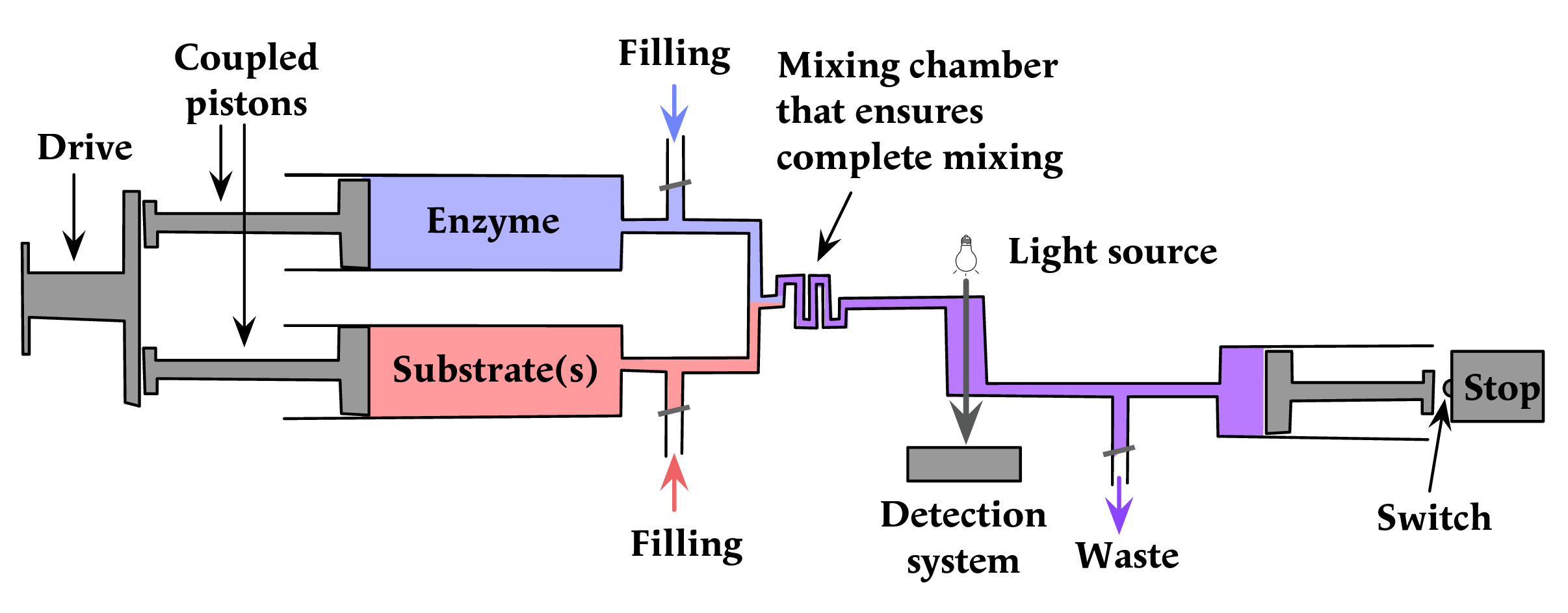
Diagram of a stopped-flow instrument

Stopped-flow spectrometry enables the solution-phase study of chemical kinetics for fast reactions, typically with half-lives in the millisecond range. Initially, it was primarily used for investigating enzyme-catalyzed reactions but quickly became a staple in biochemistry, biophysics, and chemistry laboratories for tracking rapid chemical processes.

In its simplest form, a stopped-flow system rapidly mixes two solutions. Small volumes of each solution are driven into a high-efficiency mixer, initiating a fast reaction. The mixed solution then flows into the observation cell, displacing the remaining contents from the previous experiment or a washing step. The time it takes for the solution to travel from the mixing point to the observation point is referred to as the "dead time." The minimum injection volume depends on the size of the mixing cell.

Once enough solution has been injected to completely replace the previous one, the system reaches a stationary state, and the flow is stopped. This can be achieved using a stop syringe and hard-stop assembly. At this point, the instrument sends a "start signal," or trigger, to the detector so the reaction can be observed. The timing of the trigger is software-controlled, allowing users to synchronize it with the flow stop or slightly earlier to confirm that the stationary state has been reached.

=== Dead Time, Single-Mixing, Ratio-Mixing, & Sequential Mixing ===
The performance of a stopped-flow instrument is determined to a large extent by its dead time. This is defined as the time between the reactants mixing and the observation beginning, and is essentially the age of the reaction as the reaction mixture enters the observation cell. The limiting factors in the dead time of a particular stopped-flow apparatus are the efficiency of the mixer, the distance between the mixer and the cell, and the flow rate of the reaction mixture at the instant at which flow is stopped. Depending on the dimensions of the observation cell used, modern stopped-flow instruments are typically capable of achieving dead times of between 0.5-1 milliseconds.

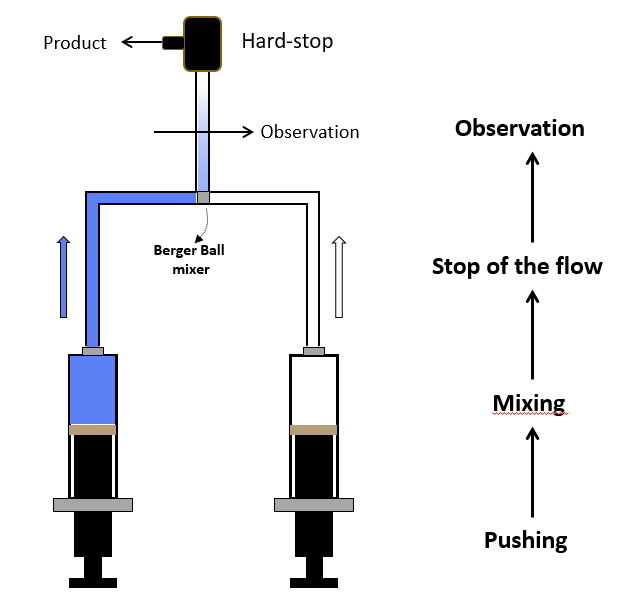
Single-mixing stopped-flow

The simplest operating mode of a stopped-flow instrument is with a single-mixing configuration. Two reactants are used; these are loaded into syringes and are forced through the mixer and optical cell by the action of a pneumatically controlled ram which drives the syringe plungers. The reaction mixture emerging from the optical cell enters a third (stop) syringe, and flow ceases when the stop syringe plunger contacts a trigger switch. This simultaneously stops the flow and starts data acquisition.

Normally, the two drive syringes are the same size, to achieve a mixing ratio of 1:1, but syringes of different sizes can be combined to obtain other mixing ratios up to 1:10 or 1:20. This so called asymmetric, or ratio mixing, is a common requirement in stopped-flow work.

Sequential-, or double-, mixing is a variation of stopped-flow in which two reactants are forced through a pre-mixer into an ageing loop. After a specified delay period, the mixed fluid is forced through a separate mixer with a third reactant, and the subsequent reaction is studied as in single-mixing. Sequential-mixing is used to investigate the behavior of reaction intermediates or short-lived transients.

=== Light Sources ===
A non-ozone-producing xenon arc lamp is commonly used for most general stopped-flow experiments above 250 nm. Broad-spectrum xenon lamps are highly versatile, allowing users to select virtually any wavelength for absorbance or fluorescence studies, making them ideal for applications such as monitoring structural changes in proteins over time.

For far-UV applications, ozone-producing xenon arc lamps are available, but they require purging with pure nitrogen gas to prevent ozone buildup and optical degradation. Alternatively, mercury-xenon (Hg-Xe) lamps are well-suited for fluorescence experiments where the desired excitation wavelength corresponds to one of the intense mercury emission lines.

LED light sources are another popular and inexpensive choice for stopped-flow experiments, especially when only a single or a few specific wavelengths are needed.

=== Reactant Syringes (Drive Syringes) ===
Two syringes are filled with solutions that remain inert until mixed. These drive syringes are coupled and simultaneously emptied into a mixing device, either by a single drive ram (piston) or independent stepping motors. Ratio mixing is easily achieved by using syringes with different volume capacities, enabling precise control over the proportions of the combined solutions. For applications requiring sequential mixing—such as preincubating two reagents before introducing a third—two independent drive rams can be employed to allow for more complex mixing sequences.

Laminar flow (left) produces little or no mixing, but turbulent flow (right) produces very rapid mixing

=== Mixing chamber ===
Once the two solutions are expelled from their syringes, they enter a mixing system designed to ensure thorough mixing, typically using a geometry like a T-mixer. This setup promotes turbulent flow, which achieves complete mixing. In contrast, laminar flow would result in the solutions flowing side by side, leading to incomplete mixing.

=== Dead Time ===
The dead time is the interval required for solutions to travel from the mixing point to the observation point, representing the portion of reaction kinetics that cannot be observed. A shorter dead time enhances instrument performance and enables the study of a wider range of reactions. Typical dead times range from 0.5 to 1 millisecond, depending on the instrument design.

Dead time can be minimized by reducing the dimensions of the flow cell, but this approach has limitations due to the decreased signal-to-noise ratio caused by smaller observation windows and shorter pathlengths. The fluorescence quenching reaction between N-acetyltryptophanamide (NAT) and N-bromosuccinimide (NBS), as described by Peterman, is a commonly used method for measuring the dead time of a stopped-flow instrument.

=== Observation Cell ===
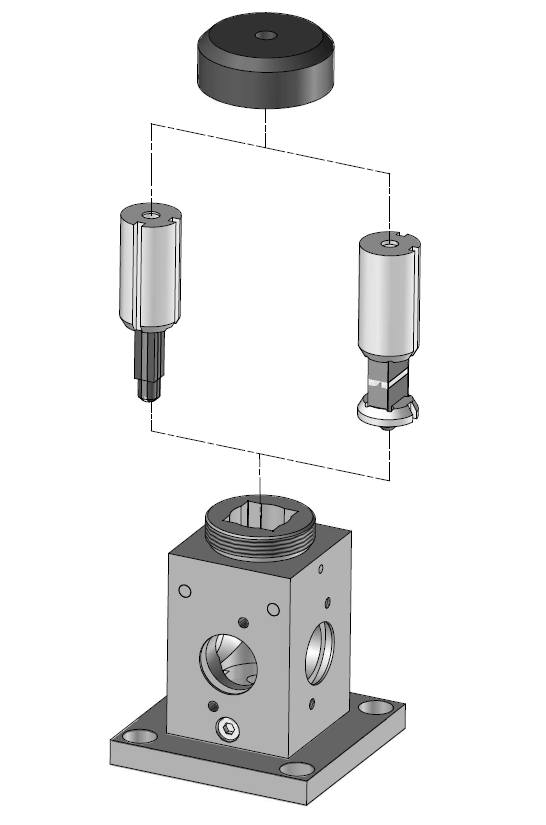
Stopped-flow observation head

The mixed reactants are delivered into an observation cell (flow cell) where the reaction can be monitored spectrophotometrically, typically using techniques such as absorbance, fluorescence, fluorescence anisotropy, or circular dichroism. It is increasingly common to combine several of these techniques for more comprehensive analysis.

Flow cell cartridges are commonly available with absorbance pathlengths ranging from 1 to 10 mm and shorter fluorescence pathlengths of around 2 mm. Short pathlengths are particularly important for fluorescence measurements to minimize the inner filter effect. Modern stopped-flow instruments are designed to accommodate a variety of flow cell sizes to suit different experimental needs.

=== Stopping the Reaction ===
Once sufficient solution has been injected to fully replace the previous contents in the observation cell, the mixture flows into a third syringe, known as the stop syringe. This syringe hits a volume-calibrated hard-stop assembly, halting the flow and bringing the system to a stationary state. At this moment, the detector is triggered to begin observing the reaction.

=== Accessories ===
Stopped-flow spectrophotometers may function as stand-alone instruments, but they are often integrated into systems for circular dichroism (CD), absorbance, and/or fluorescence measurements, or equipped with various accessories to support specialized applications. Common stopped-flow accessories include:

- Light Sources: Options include xenon (ozone- or non-ozone-producing), mercury-xenon (Hg-Xe), deuterium, and single-wavelength LED sources.
- Monochromators: Diffraction grating-based monochromators are widely used and can be configured for precise fluorescence excitation or emission scanning.
- Observation Cells: A range of flow cell sizes is available, typically with pathlengths spanning 1–10 mm.
- Detectors: Photomultiplier tube (PMT) detectors are commonly used for their high sensitivity. Photodiode array (PDA) detectors are also available for simultaneous full-spectrum data acquisition.

Other popular add-ons or accessories include:

- Fluorescence Polarization/Anisotropy Filters: For measuring molecular interactions or structural dynamics.
- Anaerobic Accessories: For experiments conducted under inert atmospheres or in glove boxes.
- Quench-Flow Adapters: Ideal for specialized experiments, such as hydrogen-deuterium exchange (HDX).

These accessories and configurations enhance the versatility of stopped-flow spectrophotometers, enabling their use across a broad range of applications in biochemistry, biophysics, and chemistry.

== Continuous-Flow ==
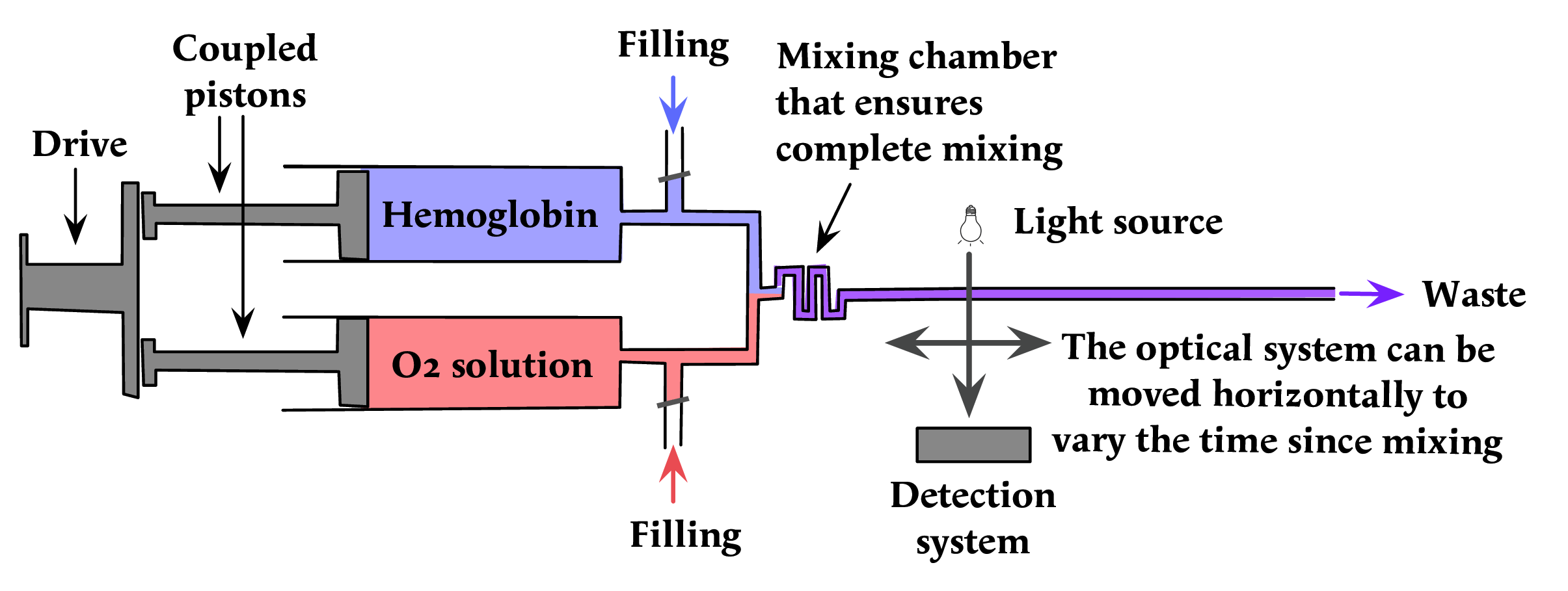
Diagram of continuous flow spectrometer for reactions with half times of a few milliseconds

The stopped-flow method evolved from the continuous-flow technique developed by Hamilton Hartridge and Francis Roughton to study the binding of oxygen to hemoglobin. In the continuous-flow system, the reaction mixture was passed through a long tube, past an observation system (a simple colorimeter in 1923), and then discarded as waste. By moving the colorimeter along the tube and knowing the flow rate, Hartridge and Roughton were able to measure reaction progress at specific time intervals.

This innovation was groundbreaking for its time, demonstrating that processes occurring within milliseconds could be studied using relatively simple equipment, despite the limitations of instruments requiring seconds for each measurement. However, the method had significant practical constraints, particularly the need for large quantities of reactants, making it suitable mainly for studies on abundant proteins like hemoglobin. Today, the continuous-flow approach is considered obsolete for practical purposes, having been replaced by more efficient and versatile techniques like stopped-flow spectrometry.

== Quenched-Flow ==
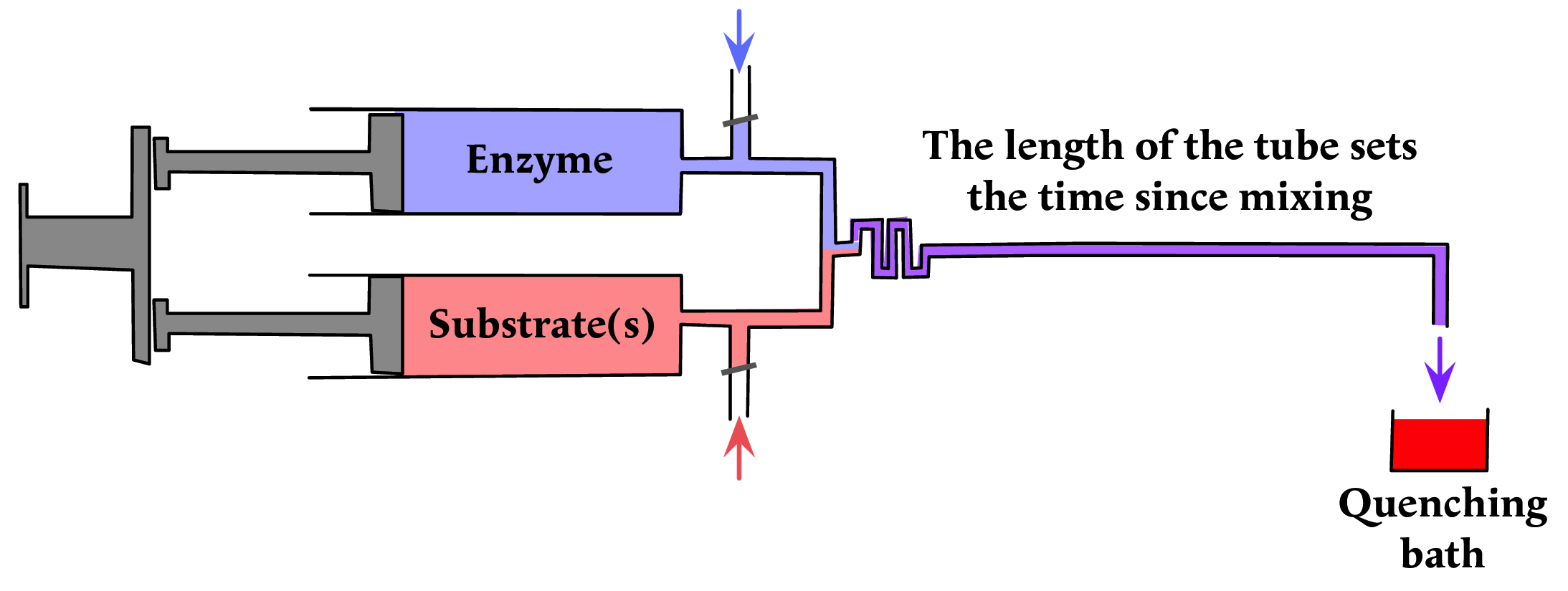
Diagram of quenched flow apparatus for following reactions with half times of a few milliseconds

The stopped-flow method relies on the presence of spectroscopic properties to monitor reactions in real time. When such properties are unavailable, quenched-flow provides an alternative by using conventional chemical analysis. Instead of a mechanical stopping system, the reaction is halted by quenching, where the products are immediately stopped by freezing, chemical denaturation, or exposure to a denaturing light source. Similar to the continuous-flow method, the time between mixing and quenching can be adjusted by varying the length of the reaction tube.

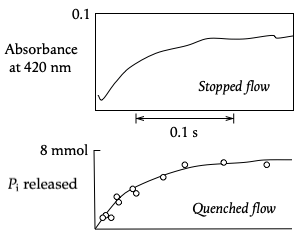
Comparison of stopped flow with quenched flow for nitrogenase from Klebsiella pneumoniae

The pulsed quenched-flow method, introduced by Alan Fersht and Ross Jakes, eliminates the need for a long reaction tube. In this approach, the reaction is initiated as in a stopped-flow experiment, but quenching is performed using a third syringe, which delivers the quenching agent at a precise, pre-set time after initiation.

Quenched-flow has distinct advantages and disadvantages compared to stopped-flow. On the positive side, chemical analysis provides clear identification of the measured process, whereas spectroscopic signals in stopped-flow experiments may sometimes be ambiguous. However, quenched-flow is significantly more labor-intensive, as each time point must be measured individually. For example, in studies of nitrogenase catalysis from Klebsiella pneumoniae, the agreement in half-times showed that absorbance at 420 nm corresponded to P_{i} release, but obtaining this result through quenched-flow required 11 individual data points, highlighting the method's demanding nature.

== Other Techniques ==
Stopped-flow is only one of multiple biophysical techniques used to study the kinetics of biological systems. For a broader perspective, Zheng et al. (2015) review various analytical methods for investigating biological interactions, including stopped-flow analysis, surface plasmon resonance spectroscopy, affinity chromatography, and capillary electrophoresis. The article provides an overview of each technique’s principles, applications, advantages, and limitations.
