= Temperature jump =

Method used in chemical kinetics

The temperature jump method is a technique used in chemical kinetics for the measurement of very rapid reaction rates. It is one of a class of chemical relaxation methods pioneered by the German physical chemist Manfred Eigen in the 1950s. In these methods, a reacting system initially at equilibrium is perturbed rapidly and then observed as it relaxes back to equilibrium. In the case of temperature jump, the perturbation involves rapid heating which changes the value of the equilibrium constant, followed by relaxation to equilibrium at the new temperature.

The heating usually involves discharging of a capacitor (in the kV range) through a small volume (< 1 mL) of a conducting solution containing the molecule/reaction to be studied. In some versions of the apparatus used, the solution is heated instead by the output of a pulsed laser which emits in the near infra-red. When laser heating is employed, the solution need not be conducting. In both cases, the temperature of the solution is caused to rise by a small amount in microseconds (or less in the case of laser heating). This allows the study of the shift in equilibrium of reactions that equilibrate in milliseconds (or microseconds with laser temperature jump), these changes most commonly being observed using absorption spectroscopy or fluorescence spectroscopy. Due to the small volumes involved the temperature of the solution returns to that of its surroundings in minutes.

The fractional extent of the reaction (i.e. the percentage change in concentration of a measurable species) depends on the molar enthalpy change (ΔH°) between the reactants and products and the equilibrium position. If K is the equilibrium constant and dT is the change in temperature then the enthalpy change is given by the Van 't Hoff equation:

$${\Delta H^o} = {RT^2}.\frac{d \ln K}{dT}$$

where R is the universal gas constant and T is the absolute temperature. When a single step in a reaction is perturbed in a temperature jump experiment, the reaction follows a single exponential decay function with time constant $(\tau)$ equal to a function of the forward (k_{a}) and reverse (k_{b}) rate constants. For the perturbation of a simple equilibrium $\ce{A <=> B}$ which is first order in both directions, the reciprocal of the time constant equals the sum of the two rate constants

$$1/\tau = k_a + k_b$$

The two rate constants can be determined from the values of $(\tau)$ and the equilibrium constant :$K = k_a / k_b$, yielding two equations for two unknowns.

In more complex reaction networks, when multiple reaction steps are perturbed, then the reciprocal time constants are given by the eigenvalues of the characteristic rate equations. The ability to observe intermediate steps in a reaction pathway is one of the attractive features of this technology.

Related chemical relaxation methods include pressure jump, electric field jump and pH jump.
