= Pressure jump =

Pressure jump is a technique used in the study of chemical kinetics. It involves making rapid changes to the pressure of an experimental system and observing the return to equilibrium or steady state. This allows the study of the shift in equilibrium of reactions that equilibrate in periods between milliseconds to hours (or longer), these changes often being observed using absorption spectroscopy, or fluorescence spectroscopy though other spectroscopic techniques such as CD, FTIR or NMR can also be used.

Historically, pressure jumps were limited to one direction. Most commonly fast drops in pressure were achieved by using a quick release valve or a fast burst membrane. Modern equipment can achieve pressure changes in both directions using either double reservoir arrangements (good for large changes in pressure) or pistons operated by piezoelectric actuators (often faster than valve based approaches). Ultra fast pressure drops can be achieved using electrically disintegrated burst membranes. The ability to automatically repeat measurements and average the results is useful since the reaction amplitudes are often small.

The fractional extent of the reaction (i.e. the percentage change in concentration of a measurable species) depends on the molar volume change (ΔV°) between the reactants and products and the equilibrium position. If K is the equilibrium constant and P is the pressure then the volume change is given by:

$$\Delta V^o = -RT \left(\frac{\partial \ln K}{\partial P} \right)_T$$

where R is the universal gas constant and T is the absolute temperature. The volume change can thus be understood to be the pressure dependency of the change in Gibbs free energy associated with the reaction.

When a single step in a reaction is perturbed in a pressure jump experiment, the reaction follows a single exponential decay function with the reciprocal time constant (1/τ) equal to the sum of the forward and reverse intrinsic rate constants. In more complex reaction networks, when multiple reaction steps are perturbed, then the reciprocal time constants are given by the eigenvalues of the characteristic rate equations. The ability to observe intermediate steps in a reaction pathway is one of the attractive features of this technology.
