= Chemical kinetics =

Study of the rates of chemical reactions

Reaction coordinate diagram showing how a catalyst lowers the activation energy in an exothermic reaction.

Chemical kinetics, also known as reaction kinetics, is the branch of physical chemistry that is concerned with understanding the rates of chemical reactions. It is different from chemical thermodynamics, which deals with the direction in which a reaction occurs but in itself tells nothing about its rate. Chemical kinetics includes investigations of how experimental conditions influence the speed of a chemical reaction and yield information about the reaction's mechanism and transition states, as well as the construction of mathematical models that also can describe the characteristics of a chemical reaction.

== History ==
The pioneering work of chemical kinetics was done by German chemist Ludwig Wilhelmy in 1850. He experimentally studied the rate of inversion of sucrose and he used integrated rate law for the determination of the reaction kinetics of this reaction. His work was noticed 34 years later by Wilhelm Ostwald. In 1864, Peter Waage and Cato Guldberg published the law of mass action, which states that the speed of a chemical reaction is proportional to the quantity of the reacting substances.

Van 't Hoff studied chemical dynamics and in 1884 published his famous "Études de dynamique chimique". In 1901 he was awarded the first Nobel Prize in Chemistry "in recognition of the extraordinary services he has rendered by the discovery of the laws of chemical dynamics and osmotic pressure in solutions". After van 't Hoff, chemical kinetics dealt with the experimental determination of reaction rates from which rate laws and rate constants are derived. Relatively simple rate laws exist for zero order reactions (for which reaction rates are independent of concentration), first order reactions, and second order reactions, and can be derived for others. Elementary reactions follow the law of mass action, but the rate law of stepwise reactions has to be derived by combining the rate laws of the various elementary steps, and can become rather complex. In consecutive reactions, the rate-determining step often determines the kinetics. In consecutive first order reactions, a steady state approximation can simplify the rate law. The activation energy for a reaction is experimentally determined through the Arrhenius equation and the Eyring equation. The main factors that influence the reaction rate include: the physical state of the reactants, the concentrations of the reactants, the temperature at which the reaction occurs, and whether or not any catalysts are present in the reaction.

Gorban and Yablonsky have suggested that the history of chemical dynamics can be divided into three eras. The first is the van 't Hoff wave searching for the general laws of chemical reactions and relating kinetics to thermodynamics. The second may be called the Semenov-Hinshelwood wave with emphasis on reaction mechanisms, especially for chain reactions. The third is associated with Aris and the detailed mathematical description of chemical reaction networks.

== Factors affecting reaction rate ==
=== Nature of the reactants ===
The reaction rate varies depending upon what substances are reacting. Acid/base reactions, the formation of salts, and ion exchange are usually fast reactions. When covalent bond formation takes place between the molecules and when large molecules are formed, the reactions tend to be slower.

The nature and strength of bonds in reactant molecules greatly influence the rate of their transformation into products.

=== Physical state ===
The physical state (solid, liquid, or gas) of a reactant is also an important factor of the rate of change. When reactants are in the same phase, as in aqueous solution, thermal motion brings them into contact. However, when they are in separate phases, the reaction is limited to the interface between the reactants. Reaction can occur only at their area of contact; in the case of a liquid and a gas, at the surface of the liquid. Vigorous shaking and stirring may be needed to bring the reaction to completion. This means that the more finely divided a solid or liquid reactant the greater its surface area per unit volume and the more contact it with the other reactant, thus the faster the reaction. To make an analogy, for example, when one starts a fire, one uses wood chips and small branches — one does not start with large logs right away. In organic chemistry, on water reactions are the exception to the rule that homogeneous reactions take place faster than heterogeneous reactions (those in which solute and solvent are not mixed properly).

=== Surface area of solid state ===
In a solid, only those particles that are at the surface can be involved in a reaction. Crushing a solid into smaller parts means that more particles are present at the surface, and the frequency of collisions between these and reactant particles increases, and so reaction occurs more rapidly. For example, Sherbet (powder) is a mixture of very fine powder of malic acid (a weak organic acid) and sodium hydrogen carbonate. On contact with the saliva in the mouth, these chemicals quickly dissolve and react, releasing carbon dioxide and providing for the fizzy sensation. Also, fireworks manufacturers modify the surface area of solid reactants to control the rate at which the fuels in fireworks are oxidised, using this to create diverse effects. For example, finely divided aluminium confined in a shell explodes violently. If larger pieces of aluminium are used, the reaction is slower and sparks are seen as pieces of burning metal are ejected.

=== Concentration ===
The reactions are due to collisions of reactant species. The frequency with which the molecules or ions collide depends upon their concentrations. The more crowded the molecules are, the more likely they are to collide and react with one another. Thus, an increase in the concentrations of the reactants will usually result in the corresponding increase in the reaction rate, while a decrease in the concentrations will usually have a reverse effect. For example, combustion will occur more rapidly in pure oxygen than in air (21% oxygen).

The rate equation shows the detailed dependence of the reaction rate on the concentrations of reactants and other species present. The mathematical forms depend on the reaction mechanism. The actual rate equation for a given reaction is determined experimentally and provides information about the reaction mechanism. The mathematical expression of the rate equation is often given by

$$v = \frac{\mathrm{d}c}{\mathrm{d}t} = k \prod_i c_i^{m_i}$$

Here $k$ is the reaction rate constant, $c_i$ is the molar concentration of reactant i and $m_i$ is the partial order of reaction for this reactant. The partial order for a reactant can only be determined experimentally and is often not indicated by its stoichiometric coefficient.

In highly diluted solutions, such as at concentrations below the micromolar level, molecular collisions are primarily governed by diffusion. Under these conditions, the apparent reaction order deviates from the stoichiometric expectation because reactant molecules require additional time to traverse longer distances before encountering one another. This behavior can be described by Fick's laws of diffusion and is consistent with fractal reaction kinetics, which yield fractional reaction orders.

=== Temperature ===
Temperature usually has a major effect on the rate of a chemical reaction. Molecules at a higher temperature have more thermal energy. Although collision frequency is greater at higher temperatures, this alone contributes only a very small proportion to the increase in rate of reaction. Much more important is the fact that the proportion of reactant molecules with sufficient energy to react (energy greater than activation energy: E > E_{a}) is significantly higher and is explained in detail by the Maxwell–Boltzmann distribution of molecular energies.

The effect of temperature on the reaction rate constant usually obeys the Arrhenius equation $k = A e^{-E_{\rm a}/(RT)}$, where A is the pre-exponential factor or A-factor, E_{a} is the activation energy, R is the molar gas constant and T is the absolute temperature.

At a given temperature, the chemical rate of a reaction depends on the value of the A-factor, the magnitude of the activation energy, and the concentrations of the reactants. Usually, rapid reactions require relatively small activation energies.

The 'rule of thumb' that the rate of chemical reactions doubles for every 10 °C temperature rise is a common misconception. This may have been generalized from the special case of biological systems, where the α (temperature coefficient) is often between 1.5 and 2.5.

The kinetics of rapid reactions can be studied with the temperature jump method. This involves using a sharp rise in temperature and observing the relaxation time of the return to equilibrium. A particularly useful form of temperature jump apparatus is a shock tube, which can rapidly increase a gas's temperature by more than 1000 degrees.

=== Catalysts ===
Generic potential energy diagram showing the effect of a catalyst in a hypothetical endothermic chemical reaction. The presence of the catalyst opens a new reaction pathway (shown in red) with a lower activation energy. The final result and the overall thermodynamics are the same.

A catalyst is a substance that alters the rate of a chemical reaction but it remains chemically unchanged afterwards. The catalyst increases the rate of the reaction by providing a new reaction mechanism to occur with in a lower activation energy. In autocatalysis a reaction product is itself a catalyst for that reaction leading to positive feedback. Proteins that act as catalysts in biochemical reactions are called enzymes. Michaelis–Menten kinetics describe the rate of enzyme mediated reactions. A catalyst does not affect the position of the equilibrium, as the catalyst speeds up the backward and forward reactions equally.

In certain organic molecules, specific substituents can have an influence on reaction rate in neighbouring group participation.

=== Pressure ===
Increasing the pressure in a gaseous reaction will increase the number of collisions between reactants, increasing the rate of reaction. This is because the activity of a gas is directly proportional to the partial pressure of the gas. This is similar to the effect of increasing the concentration of a solution.

In addition to this straightforward mass-action effect, the rate coefficients themselves can change due to pressure. The rate coefficients and products of many high-temperature gas-phase reactions change if an inert gas is added to the mixture; variations on this effect are called fall-off and chemical activation. These phenomena are due to exothermic or endothermic reactions occurring faster than heat transfer, causing the reacting molecules to have non-thermal energy distributions (non-Boltzmann distribution). Increasing the pressure increases the heat transfer rate between the reacting molecules and the rest of the system, reducing this effect.

Condensed-phase rate coefficients can also be affected by pressure, although rather high pressures are required for a measurable effect because ions and molecules are not very compressible. This effect is often studied using diamond anvils.

A reaction's kinetics can also be studied with a pressure jump approach. This involves making fast changes in pressure and observing the relaxation time of the return to equilibrium.

=== Absorption of light ===
The activation energy for a chemical reaction can be provided when one reactant molecule absorbs light of suitable wavelength and is promoted to an excited state. The study of reactions initiated by light is photochemistry, one prominent example being photosynthesis.

== Experimental methods ==
The Spinco Division Model 260 Reaction Kinetics System measured the precise rate constants of molecular reactions.

The experimental determination of reaction rates involves measuring how the concentrations of reactants or products change over time. For example, the concentration of a reactant can be measured by spectrophotometry at a wavelength where no other reactant or product in the system absorbs light.

For reactions which take at least several minutes, it is possible to start the observations after the reactants have been mixed at the temperature of interest.

=== Fast reactions ===
For faster reactions, the time required to mix the reactants and bring them to a specified temperature may be comparable or longer than the half-life of the reaction. Special methods to start fast reactions without slow mixing step include

- Stopped flow methods, which can reduce the mixing time to the order of a millisecond The stopped flow methods have limitation, for example, we need to consider the time it takes to mix gases or solutions and are not suitable if the half-life is less than about a hundredth of a second.
- Chemical relaxation methods such as temperature jump and pressure jump, in which a pre-mixed system initially at equilibrium is perturbed by rapid heating or depressurization so that it is no longer at equilibrium, and the relaxation back to equilibrium is observed. For example, this method has been used to study the neutralization H_{3}O^{+} + OH^{−} with a half-life of 1 μs or less under ordinary conditions.
- Flash photolysis, in which a laser pulse produces highly excited species such as free radicals, whose reactions are then studied.

== Equilibrium ==
While chemical kinetics is concerned with the rate of a chemical reaction, thermodynamics determines the extent to which reactions occur. In a reversible reaction, chemical equilibrium is reached when the rates of the forward and reverse reactions are equal (the principle of dynamic equilibrium) and the concentrations of the reactants and products no longer change. This is demonstrated by, for example, the Haber–Bosch process for combining nitrogen and hydrogen to produce ammonia. Chemical clock reactions such as the Belousov–Zhabotinsky reaction demonstrate that component concentrations can oscillate for a long time before finally attaining the equilibrium.

== Free energy ==
In general terms, the free energy change (ΔG) of a reaction determines whether a chemical change will take place, but kinetics describes how fast the reaction is. A reaction can be very exothermic and have a very positive entropy change but will not happen in practice if the reaction is too slow. If a reactant can produce two products, the thermodynamically most stable one will form in general, except in special circumstances when the reaction is said to be under kinetic reaction control. The Curtin–Hammett principle applies when determining the product ratio for two reactants interconverting rapidly, each going to a distinct product. It is possible to make predictions about reaction rate constants for a reaction from free-energy relationships.

The kinetic isotope effect is the difference in the rate of a chemical reaction when an atom in one of the reactants is replaced by one of its isotopes.

Chemical kinetics provides information on residence time and heat transfer in a chemical reactor in chemical engineering and the molar mass distribution in polymer chemistry. It is also provides information in corrosion engineering.

== Applications and models ==
The mathematical models that describe chemical reaction kinetics provide chemists and chemical engineers with tools to better understand and describe chemical processes such as food decomposition, microorganism growth, stratospheric ozone decomposition, and the chemistry of biological systems. These models can also be used in the design or modification of chemical reactors to optimize product yield, more efficiently separate products, and eliminate environmentally harmful by-products. When performing catalytic cracking of heavy hydrocarbons into gasoline and light gas, for example, kinetic models can be used to find the temperature and pressure at which the highest yield of heavy hydrocarbons into gasoline will occur.

Chemical Kinetics is frequently validated and explored through modeling in specialized packages as a function of ordinary differential equation-solving (ODE-solving) and curve-fitting.

=== Numerical methods ===
In some cases, equations are unsolvable analytically, but can be solved using numerical methods if data values are given. There are two different ways to do this, by either using software programmes or mathematical methods such as the Euler method. Examples of software for chemical kinetics are i) Tenua, a Java app which simulates chemical reactions numerically and allows comparison of the simulation to real data, ii) Python coding for calculations and estimates and iii) the Kintecus software compiler to model, regress, fit and optimize reactions.

-Numerical integration: for a 1st order reaction A → B

The differential equation of the reactant A is:
$$\frac{d\ce{[A]}}{dt} = -k\ce{[A]}$$

It can also be expressed as
$$\frac{d\ce{[A]}}{dt} = f(t,\ce{[A]})$$
which is the same as $y' = f(x, y)$

To solve the differential equations with Euler and Runge-Kutta methods we need to have the initial values.

- Euler method → simple but inaccurate.
  At any point $y'=f(x, y)$ is the same as
  $$y'= \frac{dy}{dx}$$
  We can approximate the differentials as discrete increases:
  $$y'= \frac{dy}{dx} \approx \frac {\Delta y} {\Delta x} = \frac {y(x + \Delta x) - y(x)} {\Delta x}$$
  The unknown part of the equation is y(x+Δx), which can be found if we have the data for the initial values.
- Runge-Kutta methods → it is more accurate than the Euler method. In this method, an initial condition is required: y = y_{0} at x = x_{0}. The problem is to find the value of y when x = x_{0} + h, where h is a given constant.
  It can be shown analytically that the ordinate at that moment to the curve through (x_{0}, y_{0}) is given by the third-order Runge-Kutta formula.
  In first-order ordinary equations, the Runge-Kutta method uses a mathematical model that represents the relationship between the temperature and the rate of reaction. It is worth it to calculate the rate of reaction at different temperatures for different concentrations. The equation obtained is: $dr/dt = R/T+r\Delta H^\circ/RT^2$
- Stochastic methods → probabilities of the differential rate laws and the kinetic constants. In an equilibrioum reaction with direct and inverse rate constants, it is easier to transform from A to B rather than B to A.
  As for probability computations, at each time it choose a random number to be compared with a threshold to know if the reaction runs from A to B or the other way around.

== See also ==
- Autocatalytic reactions and order creation
- Corrosion engineering
- Detonation
- Electrochemical kinetics
- Flame speed
- Heterogenous catalysis
- Intrinsic low-dimensional manifold
- MLAB chemical kinetics modeling package
- Nonthermal surface reaction
- PottersWheel Matlab toolbox to fit chemical rate constants to experimental data
- Reaction progress kinetic analysis
