= Denaturation midpoint =

Denaturation midpoint of a protein is defined as the temperature (T_{m}) or concentration of denaturant (C_{m}) at which both the folded and unfolded states are equally populated at equilibrium (assuming two-state protein folding). T_{m} is often determined using a thermal shift assay.

If the widths of the folded and unfolded wells are assumed to be equal both these states will have identical free energies at the midpoint. However, for natural proteins this is not the case. There is an inherent asymmetry as evidenced by the difference in heat capacities between them - the folded ensemble has a lower heat capacity (in other words, lower fluctuations thus indicating a narrower well) than the unfolded ensemble. This would mean that the free energy of the folded state is lower at the denaturation midpoint than the unfolded state. In such a scenario, the temperature at which both the wells have identical free energies is termed the characteristic temperature (T_{o}).
