= Biomolecular condensate =

Class of membrane-less organelles within biological cells

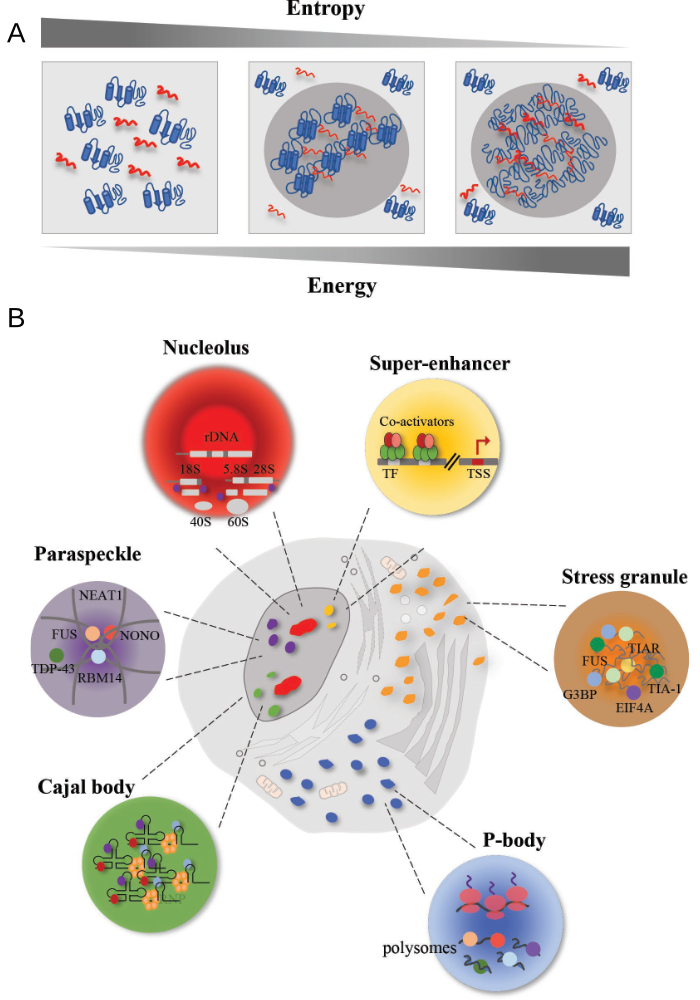
Formation and examples of membraneless organelles

In biochemistry, biomolecular condensates are a class of membrane-less organelles and organelle subdomains, which carry out specialized functions within the cell.

Unlike many organelles, biomolecular condensate composition is not controlled by a bounding membrane. Instead, condensates form and maintain organization through a range of different processes. The most well-known process is phase separation of proteins, RNA, and other biopolymers into either colloidal emulsions, gels, liquid crystals, solid crystals, or protein aggregates within cells.

== History ==
=== Micellar theory ===
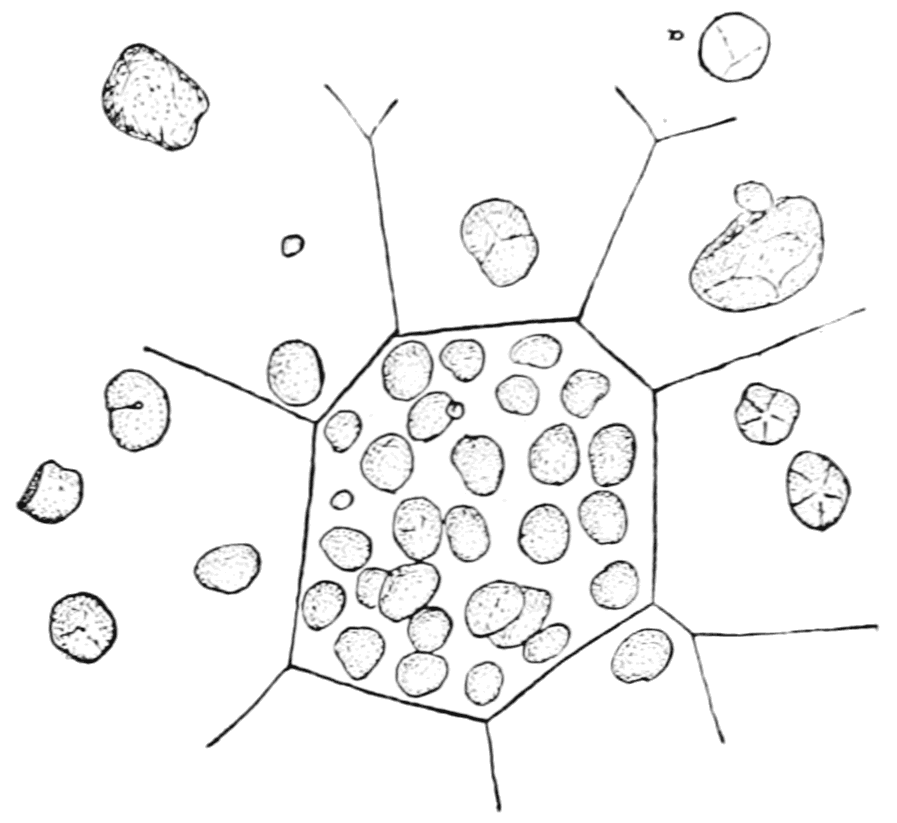
Starch granules of corn

The micellar theory of Carl Nägeli was developed from his detailed study of starch granules in 1858. Amorphous substances such as starch and cellulose were proposed to consist of building blocks, packed in a loosely crystalline array to form what he later termed "micelles". Water could penetrate between the micelles, and new micelles could form in the interstices between old micelles. The swelling of starch grains and their growth was described by a molecular-aggregate model, which he also applied to the cellulose of the plant cell wall. The modern usage of 'micelle' refers strictly to lipids, but its original usage clearly extended to other types of biomolecule, and this legacy is reflected to this day in the description of milk as being composed of 'casein micelles'.

=== Colloidal phase separation theory ===
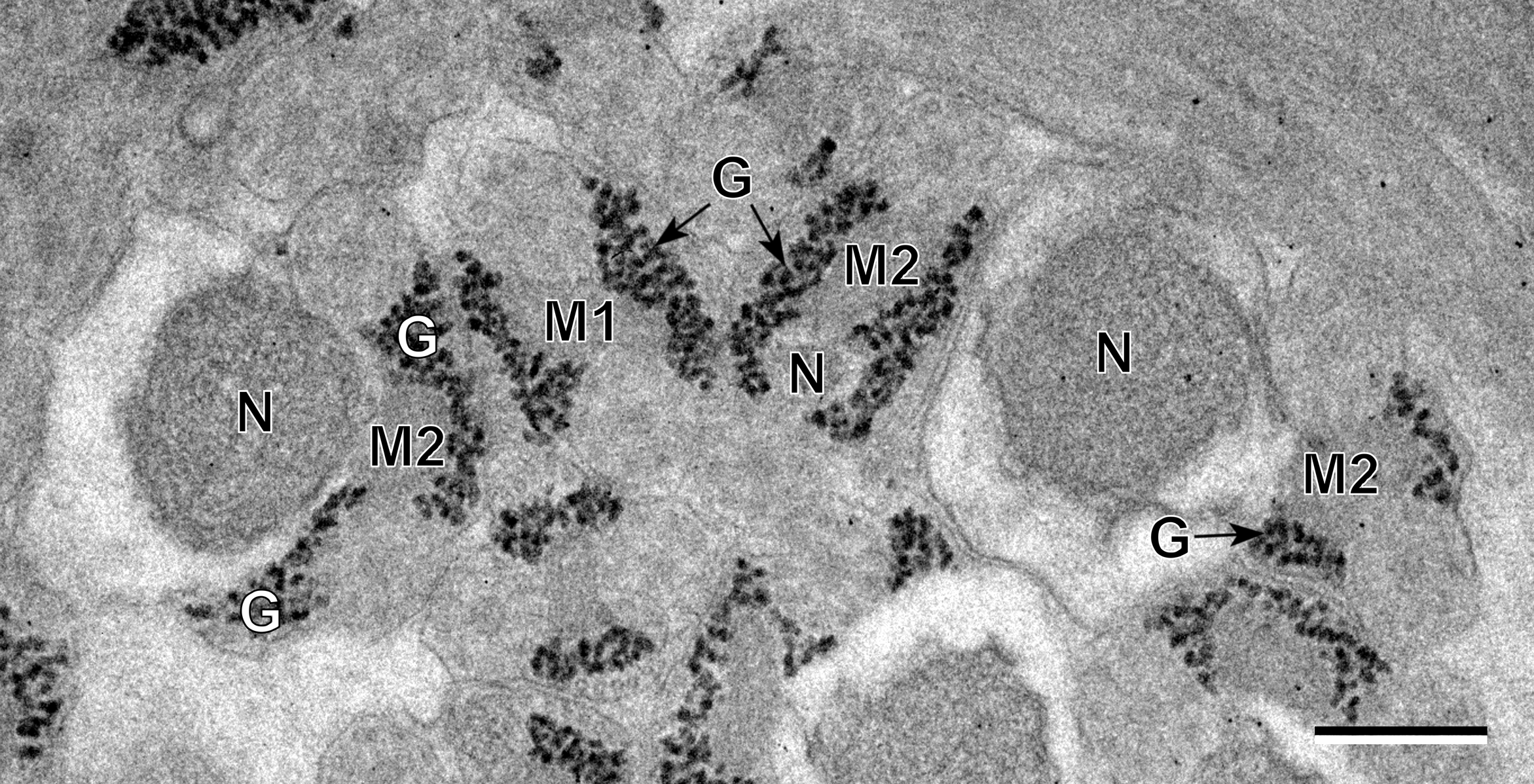
Glycogen granules in Spermiogenesis in Pleurogenidae (Digenea)

The concept of intracellular colloids as an organizing principle for the compartmentalization of living cells dates back to the end of the 19th century, beginning with William Bate Hardy and Edmund Beecher Wilson who described the cytoplasm (then called 'protoplasm') as a colloid. Around the same time, Thomas Harrison Montgomery Jr. described the morphology of the nucleolus, an organelle within the nucleus, which has subsequently been shown to form through intracellular phase separation. WB Hardy linked formation of biological colloids with phase separation in his study of globulins, stating that: "The globulin is dispersed in the solvent as particles which are the colloid particles and which are so large as to form an internal phase", and further contributed to the basic physical description of oil-water phase separation.

Colloidal phase separation as a driving force in cellular organisation appealed strongly to Stephane Leduc, who wrote in his influential 1911 book The Mechanism of Life: "Hence the study of life may be best begun by the study of those physico-chemical phenomena which result from the contact of two different liquids. Biology is thus but a branch of the physico-chemistry of liquids; it includes the study of electrolytic and colloidal solutions, and of the molecular forces brought into play by solution, osmosis, diffusion, cohesion, and crystallization."

The primordial soup theory of the origin of life, proposed by Alexander Oparin in Russian in 1924 (published in English in 1936) and by J.B.S. Haldane in 1929, suggested that life was preceded by the formation of what Haldane called a "hot dilute soup" of "colloidal organic substances", and which Oparin referred to as 'coacervates' (after de Jong) – particles composed of two or more colloids which might be protein, lipid or nucleic acid. These ideas strongly influenced the subsequent work of Sidney W. Fox on proteinoid microspheres.

=== Support from other disciplines ===
Micelle caseine

When cell biologists largely abandoned colloidal phase separation, it was left to relative outsiders – agricultural scientists and physicists – to make further progress in the study of phase separating biomolecules in cells.

Beginning in the early 1970s, Harold M Farrell Jr. at the US Department of Agriculture developed a colloidal phase separation model for milk casein micelles that form within mammary gland cells before secretion as milk.

Also in the 1970s, physicists Tanaka & Benedek at MIT identified phase-separation behaviour of gamma-crystallin proteins from lens epithelial cells and cataracts in solution, which Benedek called protein condensation.

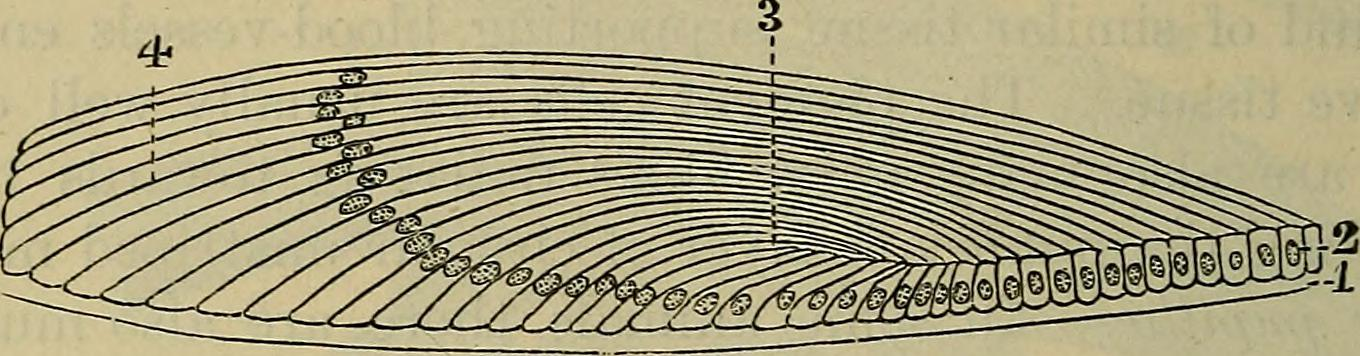
Lens epithelium containing crystallin. Hand-book of physiology (1892)

In the 1980s and 1990s, Athene Donald's polymer physics lab in Cambridge extensively characterised phase transitions / phase separation of starch granules from the cytoplasm of plant cells, which behave as liquid crystals.

In 1991, Pierre-Gilles de Gennes received the Nobel Prize in Physics for developing a generalized theory of phase transitions with particular applications to describing ordering and phase transitions in polymers. Unfortunately, de Gennes wrote in Nature that polymers should be distinguished from other types of colloids, even though they can display similar clustering and phase separation behaviour, a stance that has been reflected in the reduced usage of the term colloid to describe the higher-order association behaviour of biopolymers in modern cell biology and molecular self-assembly.

=== Phase separation revisited ===
Advances in confocal microscopy at the end of the 20th century identified proteins, RNA or carbohydrates localising to many non-membrane bound cellular compartments within the cytoplasm or nucleus which were variously referred to as 'puncta/dots', 'signalosomes', 'granules', 'bodies', 'assemblies', 'paraspeckles', 'purinosomes', 'inclusions', 'aggregates' or 'factories'. During this time period (1995-2008) the concept of phase separation was re-borrowed from colloidal chemistry & polymer physics and proposed to underlie both cytoplasmic and nuclear compartmentalization.

Since 2009, further evidence for biomacromolecules undergoing intracellular phase transitions (phase separation) has been observed in many different contexts, both within cells and in reconstituted in vitro experiments.

The newly coined term "biomolecular condensate" refers to biological polymers (as opposed to synthetic polymers) that undergo self assembly via clustering to increase the local concentration of the assembling components, and is analogous to the physical definition of condensation.

In physics, condensation typically refers to a gas–liquid phase transition.

In biology the term 'condensation' is used much more broadly and can also refer to liquid–liquid phase separation to form colloidal emulsions or liquid crystals within cells, and liquid–solid phase separation to form gels, sols, or suspensions within cells as well as liquid-to-solid phase transitions such as DNA condensation during prophase of the cell cycle or protein condensation of crystallins in cataracts. With this in mind, the term 'biomolecular condensates' was deliberately introduced to reflect this breadth (see below). Since biomolecular condensation generally involves oligomeric or polymeric interactions between an indefinite number of components, it is generally considered distinct from formation of smaller stoichiometric protein complexes with defined numbers of subunits, such as viral capsids or the proteasome – although both are examples of spontaneous molecular self-assembly or self-organisation.

Mechanistically, it appears that the conformational landscape (in particular, whether it is enriched in extended disordered states) and multivalent interactions between intrinsically disordered proteins (including cross-beta polymerisation), and/or protein domains that induce head-to-tail oligomeric or polymeric clustering, might play a role in phase separation of proteins.

== Examples ==
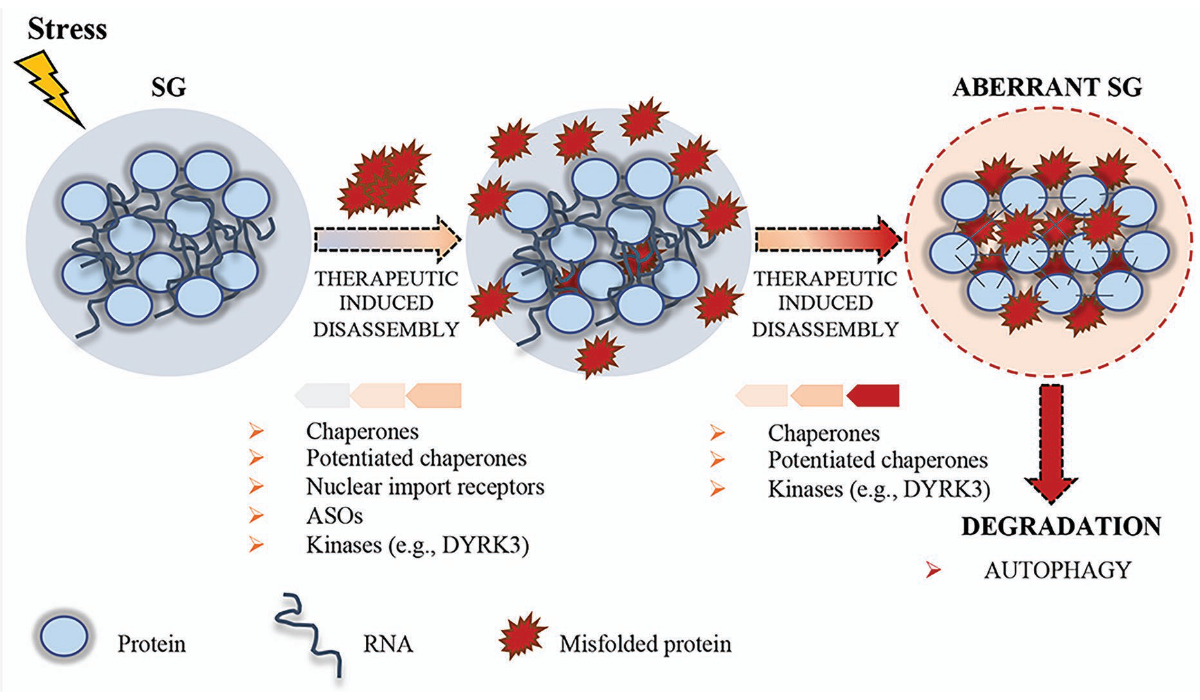
Stress granule dynamics

Many examples of biomolecular condensates have been characterized in the cytoplasm and the nucleus that are thought to arise by either liquid–liquid or liquid–solid phase separation.

=== Cytoplasmic condensates ===
- Lewy bodies
- Stress granule
- P-body
- Germline P-granules – oskar
- Starch granules
- Glycogen granules
- Frodosomes (Dact1)
- Corneal lens formation and cataracts
- Other cytoplasmic inclusions such as pigment granules or cytoplasmic crystals
- Purinosomes
- Misfolded protein aggregation such as amyloid fibrils or mutant Haemoglobin S (HbS) fibres in sickle cell disease
- Signalosomes, such as the supramolecular assemblies in the Wnt signaling pathway.
- It can also be argued that cytoskeletal filaments form by a polymerisation process similar to phase separation, except ordered into filamentous networks instead of amorphous droplets or granules.
- Bacteria Ribonucleoprotein Bodies (BR-bodies)- In recent studies it has been shown that bacteria RNA degradosomes can assemble into phase-separated structures, termed bacterial ribonucleoprotein bodies (BR-bodies), with many analogous properties to eukaryotic processing bodies (P-bodies) and stress granules.
- FLOE1 granules: FLOE1 is a prion-like seed-specific protein that controls plant seed germination via phase separation into biomolecular condensates.
- Perinuclear compartment

=== Nuclear condensates ===
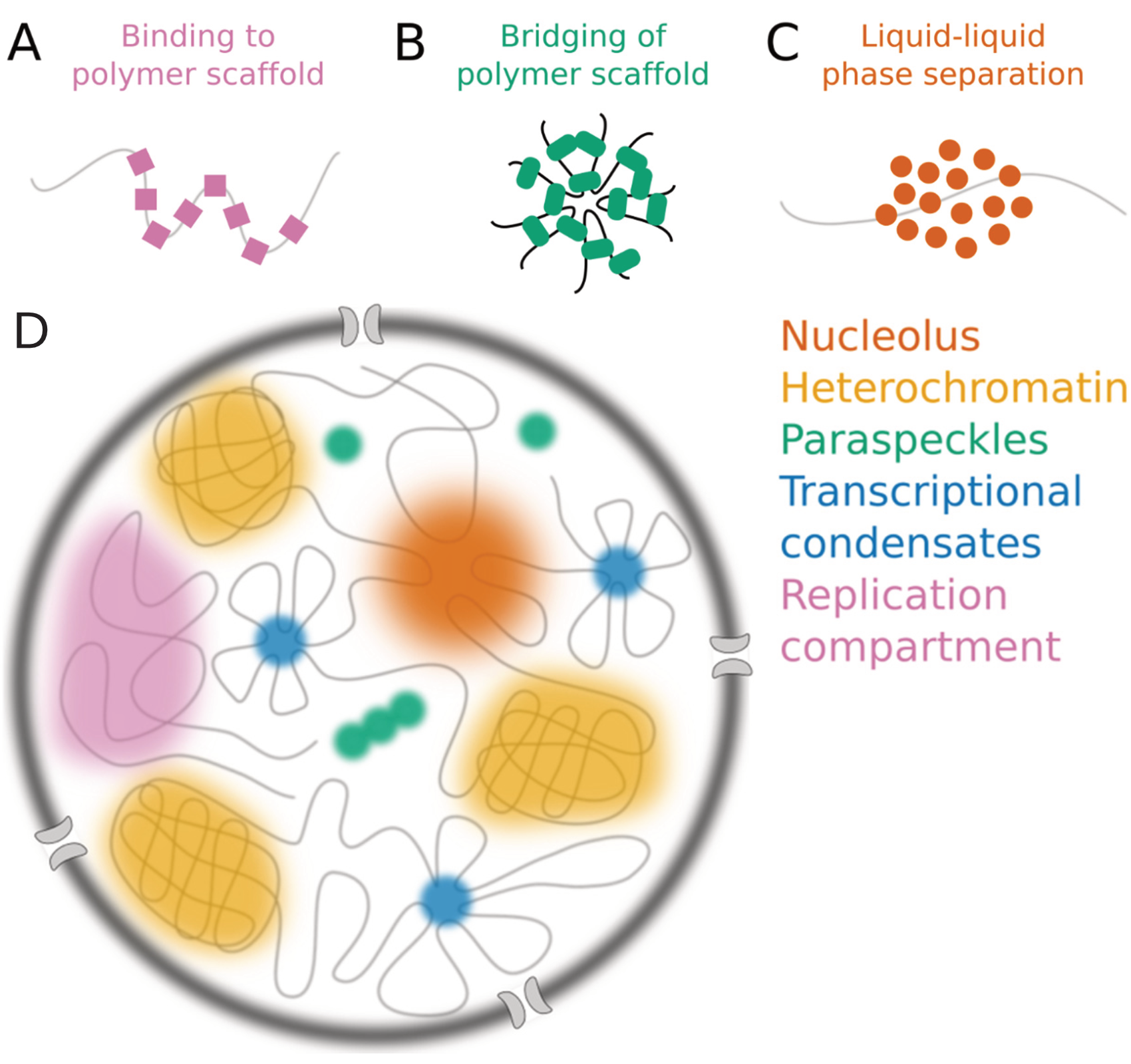
Formation and examples of nuclear bodies

- Nucleolus
- Nuclear speckle
- Cajal body
- Paraspeckle
- Synaptonemal complex

Other nuclear structures including heterochromatin form by mechanisms similar to phase separation, so can also be classified as biomolecular condensates.

RNAs with triplet expansion that produce neurodegenerative disorders can also independently form RNA foci in vitro or in mammalian nuclei. This phenomenon is further reconsituted in bacteria E. coli, by expressing engineered CAG repeats, providing strong evidence that these RNA repeats phase separate without the need of additional proteins.

=== Plasma membrane associated condensates ===
- Membrane protein, or membrane-associated protein, clustering at neurological synapses, cell-cell tight junctions, or other membrane domains.

=== Secreted extracellular condensates ===
- Secreted thyroglobulin colloid and colloid nodules of the thyroid gland
- Secreted casein 'micelles' of the mammary gland
- Serum albumin and globulins
- Secreted lysozyme

=== Lipid-enclosed organelles and lipoproteins are not considered condensates ===
Typical organelles or endosomes enclosed by a lipid bilayer are not considered biomolecular condensates. In addition, lipid droplets are surrounded by a lipid monolayer in the cytoplasm, or in milk, or in tears, so appear to fall under the 'membrane bound' category. Finally, secreted LDL and HDL lipoprotein particles are also enclosed by a lipid monolayer. The formation of these structures involves phase separation to from colloidal micelles or liquid crystal bilayers, but they are not classified as biomolecular condensates, as this term is reserved for non-membrane bound organelles.

== Liquid–liquid phase separation (LLPS) in biology ==
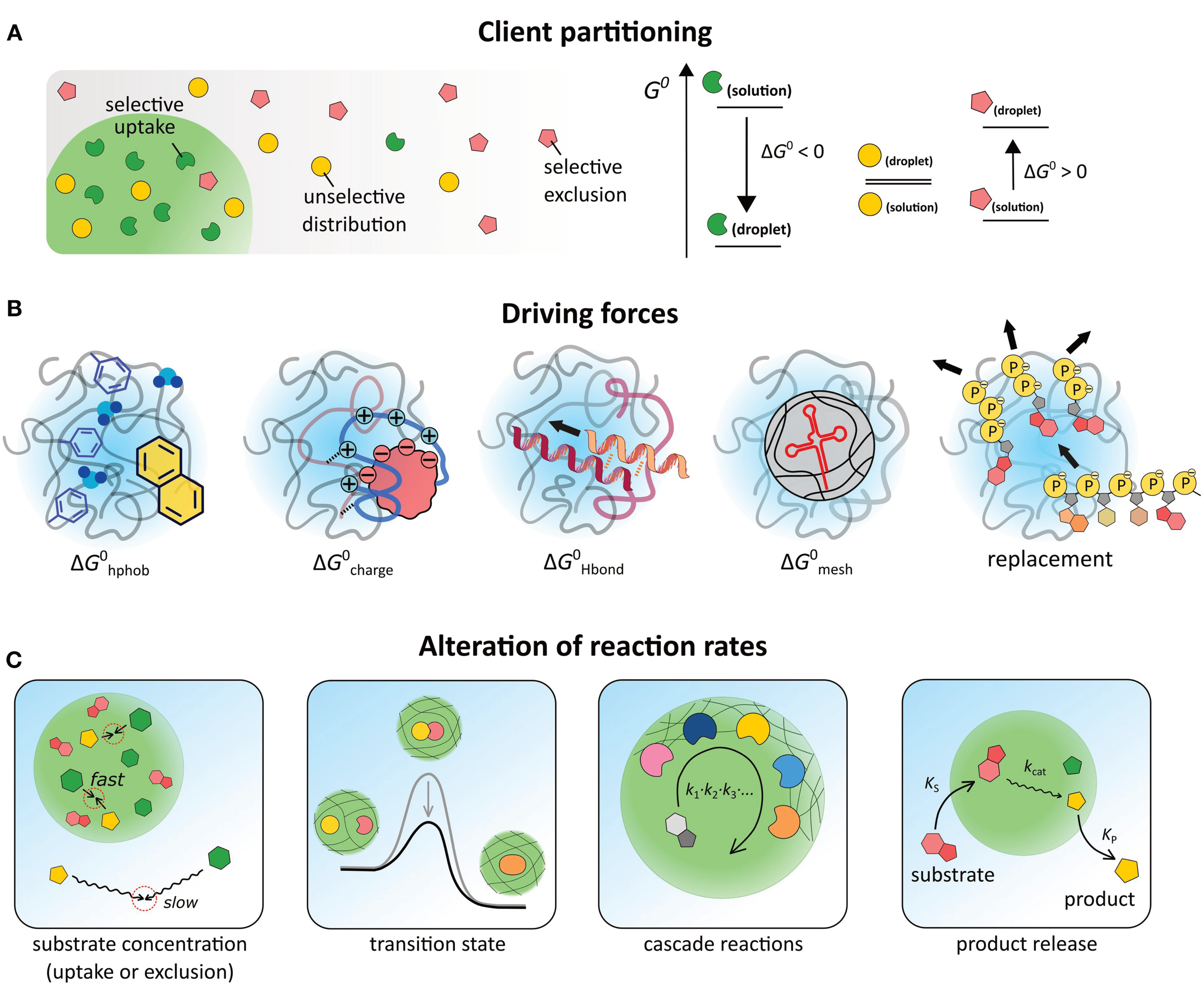
Biomolecular partitioning

=== Liquid biomolecular condensates ===
Liquid–liquid phase separation (LLPS) generates a subtype of colloid known as an emulsion that can coalesce to form large droplets within a liquid. Ordering of molecules during liquid–liquid phase separation can generate liquid crystals rather than emulsions. In cells, LLPS produces a liquid subclass of biomolecular condensate that can behave as either an emulsion or liquid crystal.

The term biomolecular condensates was introduced in the context of intracellular assemblies as a convenient but non-exclusionary term to describe non-stoichiometric assemblies of biomolecules. The choice of language here is specific and important. It has been proposed that many biomolecular condensates form through liquid–liquid phase separation (LLPS) to form colloidal emulsions or liquid crystals in living organisms, as opposed to liquid–solid phase separation to form crystals/aggregates in gels, sols or suspensions within cells or extracellular secretions. However, unequivocally demonstrating that a cellular body forms through liquid–liquid phase separation is challenging, because different material states (liquid vs. gel vs. solid) are not always easy to distinguish in living cells. The term "biomolecular condensate" directly addresses this challenge by making no assumption regarding either the physical mechanism through which assembly is achieved, nor the material state of the resulting assembly. Consequently, cellular bodies that form through liquid–liquid phase separation are a subset of biomolecular condensates, as are those where the physical origins of assembly are unknown. Historically, many cellular non-membrane bound compartments identified microscopically fall under the broad umbrella of biomolecular condensates.

In physics, phase separation can be classified into the following types of colloid, of which biomolecular condensates are one example:

Medium/phase		Dispersed phase		
Medium/phase		Gas	Liquid	Solid
Dispersion medium	Gas	No such colloids are known. Helium and xenon are known to be immiscible under certain conditions.	Liquid aerosol Examples: fog, clouds, condensation, mist, hair sprays	Solid aerosol Examples: smoke, ice cloud, atmospheric particulate matter
Dispersion medium	Liquid	Foam; Example: whipped cream, shaving cream, Gas vesicles	Emulsion or liquid crystal Examples: milk, mayonnaise, hand cream, latex, biological membranes, micelles, lipoproteins, silk, liquid biomolecular condensates	Sol or suspension Examples: pigmented ink, sediment, precipitates, aggregates, fibres/fibrils/filaments, crystals, solid biomolecular condensates
Dispersion medium	Solid	Solid foam Examples: aerogel, styrofoam, pumice	Gel; Examples: agar, gelatin, jelly, gel-like biomolecular condensates	Solid sol Example: cranberry glass

In biology, the most relevant forms of phase separation are either liquid–liquid or liquid–solid, although there have been reports of gas vesicles surrounded by a phase separated protein coat in the cytoplasm of some microorganisms.

=== Composition and selectivity ===
Condensate components are usually divided into scaffolds, which drive phase separation, and clients, which do not phase separate on their own but can still be recruited into the dense phase. Client recruitment depends on the number of available binding sites as well as the valency and affinity of the client, so changes in scaffold stoichiometry can alter the composition of the condensate.

Partitioning is also influenced by physical factors that are distinct from specific binding. Because condensates consist of dense networks of intrinsically disordered regions (IDRs), inserting a molecule restricts the conformational freedom of the surrounding chains, resulting in an entropic penalty that increases with particle size. Calculations combined with coarse-grained modelling show that the free energy of insertion increases with both IDR density and particle size, and becomes dependent on particle surface area once the particle is larger than the network mesh size. At typical IDR concentrations, particles as small as 4 nm in diameter can be almost entirely excluded, with approximately 97% exclusion in the absence of favourable interactions with condensate components. While biomolecular condensates are traditionally viewed as assemblies driven by macromolecules like proteins and nucleic acids, recent research has demonstrated that small metabolite molecules can also undergo phase separation independently. Specifically, adenosine triphosphate (ATP)—a common constituent and hydrotrope in protein-rich condensates—has been shown to undergo robust, protein-independent liquid–liquid phase separation (LLPS) in the presence of polyethylene glycol (PEG) acting as a macromolecular crowding agent.

=== Condensate microenvironment ===
The condensate microenvironment refers to the distinct internal physical and chemical conditions within biomolecular condensates that influence molecular behavior and biochemical activity. These environments can differ markedly from the surrounding cellular milieu in terms of material property, pH, and chemical property. Rather than acting solely as passive concentration hubs, condensates modulate their internal milieu to promote selective partitioning, regulate reaction kinetics, and enable context-specific biological functions.

Experimental studies have revealed several mechanisms by which condensate microenvironments operate. The material properties of condensates have been linked to condensate composition and functions. Nucleolar condensates have been shown to maintain internal pH gradients that influence RNA processing and protein composition. Other studies have demonstrated that different nuclear condensates exhibit distinct solvent characteristics, shaping the partitioning behavior of small molecules and biochemical cofactors.

Further direct evidence comes from experiments using synthetic tools to manipulate condensate material properties. One study introduced a genetically encoded peptide, killswitch, that selectively arrests condensate dynamics without disrupting their scaffolds, enabling controlled perturbation of condensate material property in live cells. This intervention altered the protein composition of transcriptional condensates and impaired their biological activity. In mouse leukemia model driven by fusion oncoprotein, condensate arrest suppressed target gene expression and inhibited cell proliferation. These findings provide mechanistic support for the functional relevance of the condensate microenvironment.

Together, these studies establish the condensate microenvironment as a key mechanism in the regulation of biochemical specificity, localization, and activity within cells.

=== Wnt signalling ===
One of the first discovered examples of a highly dynamic intracellular liquid biomolecular condensate with a clear physiological function were the supramolecular complexes (Wnt signalosomes) formed by components of the Wnt signaling pathway. The Dishevelled (Dsh or Dvl) protein undergoes clustering in the cytoplasm via its DIX domain, which mediates protein clustering (polymerisation) and phase separation, and is important for signal transduction. The Dsh protein functions both in planar polarity and Wnt signalling, where it recruits another supramolecular complex (the Axin complex) to Wnt receptors at the plasma membrane. The formation of these Dishevelled and Axin containing droplets is conserved across metazoans, including in Drosophila, Xenopus, and human cells.

=== P granules ===
Another example of liquid droplets in cells are the germline P granules in Caenorhabditis elegans. These granules separate out from the cytoplasm and form droplets, as oil does from water. Both the granules and the surrounding cytoplasm are liquid in the sense that they flow in response to forces, and two of the granules can coalesce when they come in contact. When (some of) the molecules in the granules are studied (via fluorescence recovery after photobleaching), they are found to rapidly turnover in the droplets, meaning that molecules diffuse into and out of the granules, just as expected in a liquid droplet. The droplets can also grow to be many molecules across (micrometres) Studies of droplets of the Caenorhabditis elegans protein LAF-1 in vitro also show liquid-like behaviour, with an apparent viscosity $\eta \sim 10$Pa s. This is about a ten thousand times that of water at room temperature, but it is small enough to enable the LAF-1 droplets to flow like a liquid. Generally, interaction strength (affinity) and valence (number of binding sites) of the phase separating biomolecules influence their condensates viscosity, as well as their overall tendency to phase separate.

== Liquid–liquid phase separation in human disease ==
Growing evidence suggests that anomalies in biomolecular condensates formation can lead to a number of human pathologies such as cancer and neurodegenerative diseases.

== Biomolecular condensates in plants ==
Biomolecular condensates can play other roles in plants besides the compartmentalization of biochemical processes. They can integrate environmental cues and modulate plant development in response, influencing processes like floral transition. They achieve this by sequestering interacting components, enhancing dwell time, and interacting with cytoplasmic properties in response to environmental changes. They have shown to be involved also in autophagy, RNA silencing, and plant immunity.

NAtural Deep Eutectic Solvents (NADES) are mixtures of natural compounds such as amino acids, sugars, choline, and organic acids that can solubilize high amounts of natural products. NADES are hypothesized to be the third liquid phase in plants, due to their presence in plant cells together with their ability to improve and stabilise enzymatic reactions, as well as enhance extraction and dissolution of natural products. They are speculated to facilitate the formation of phase-separated inclusions, aiding in the storage and transport of specific metabolites such as anthocyanins, dhurrin, and vanillin.

Emerging arenas for plant-virus battles

The spatial organization of cellular components enables the localization and regulation of proteins and other molecules involved in immune responses. This organization is particularly relevant in plants, which rely primarily on cell-autonomous immune responses and systemic signaling rather than the mobile immune cells found in animals.

Biomolecular condensates concentrate specific proteins and RNAs, thereby regulating their localization and biochemical activities such as gene expression. These properties allow condensates to function as hubs for cellular processes involved in plant defense.

Among pathogens, viruses stand out for their ability to manipulate host cellular processes, including gene expression, intracellular transport and antiviral defense mechanisms, to meet their own needs. Because viral replication depends on host cellular machinery, the spatial organization of host components can influence interactions between viral and cellular factors. Biomolecular condensates can therefore contribute to host–virus interactions by regulating the localization and activity of molecules involved in antiviral responses. Conversely, viral proteins may interact with host condensate components or influence condensate formation and dynamics to promote infection.

In this context, RNA granules, including stress granules and P-bodies, have emerged as important sites of RNA regulation during viral infection, especially in plants, where these structures are increasingly being investigated as biological battlegrounds where host and viral components meet in a microscopic tug-of-war.

== Synthetic biomolecular condensates ==
Biomolecular condensates can be synthesized for a number of purposes. Synthetic biomolecular condensates are inspired by endogenous biomolecular condensates, such as nucleoli, P bodies, and stress granules, which are essential to normal cellular organization and function.

Synthetic condensates are an important tool in synthetic biology, and have a wide and growing range of applications. Engineered synthetic condensates allow for probing cellular organization, regulating cellular physiology, facilitating metabolic pathways, and enable the creation of novel functionalized biological materials, which have the potential to serve as drug delivery platforms and therapeutic agents.

=== Design and control ===
Despite the dynamic nature and lack of binding specificity that govern the formation of biomolecular condensates, synthetic condensates can still be engineered to exhibit different behaviors. One popular way to conceptualize condensate interactions and aid in design is through the "sticker-spacer" framework. Multivalent interaction sites, or "stickers", are separated by "spacers", which provide the conformational flexibility and physically separate individual interaction modules from one another. Proteins regions identified as 'stickers' usually consist of Intrinsically Disordered Regions (IDRs) that act as "sticky" biopolymers via short patches of interacting residues patterned along their unstructured chain, which collectively promote LLPS under the right physiological conditions and at sufficiently high concentrations. Another class is RNA-based design demonstrated as TEARS (Transcriptionally Engineered Addressable RNA Solvent droplets), where repeating CAG ribonucleotides (rCAG) function as the multivalent "stickers." to form condensates within bacterial cells. By modifying the sticker-spacer framework, i.e. the polypeptide and RNA sequences as well as their mixture compositions, the material properties (viscous and elastic regimes) of condensates can be tuned to design novel condensates.

Other tools outside of tuning the sticker-spacer framework can be used to give new functionality and to allow for high temporal and spatial control over synthetic condensates. One way is to fuse modular binding sites (e.g., MS2 RNA tagging system, or RIDD-RIAD dock-and-lock system) to the phase-separating domain (e.g., synthetic RNA repeat, or IDP) that recruit "solute" or "client" of interest. Such a modular design enables engineering, optimization, and reusability of each fusion molecule, thus commonly applied in synthetic biology and metabolic engineering. Moreover, by applying a relatively slower binding system (e.g., split GFP), the recruitment of target into synthetic condensate can be fine-tuned by growth and division rates of the living cells.

Another way to gain temporal control over the formation and dissolution of biomolecular condensates is by using optogenetic tools. Several different systems have been developed which allow for control of condensate formation and dissolution which rely on chimeric protein expression, and light or small molecule activation. In one system, proteins are expressed in a cell which contain light-activated oligomerization domains fused to IDRs. Upon irradiation with a specific wavelength of light, the oligomerization domains bind each other and form a 'core', which also brings multiple IDRs close together because they are fused to the oligomerization domains. The recruitment of multiple IDRs effectively creates a new biopolymer with increased valency. This increased valency allows for the IDRs to form multivalent interactions and trigger LLPS. When the activation light is stopped, the oligomerization domains disassemble, causing the dissolution of the condensate. A similar system achieves the same temporal control of condensate formation by using light-sensitive 'caged' dimerizers. In this case, light-activation removes the dimerizer cage, allowing it to recruit IDRs to multivalent cores, which then triggers phase separation. Light-activation of a different wavelength results in the dimerizer being cleaved, which then releases the IDRs from the core and consequentially dissolves the condensate. This dimerizer system requires significantly reduced amounts of laser light to operate, which is advantageous because high intensity light can be toxic to cells.

Optogenetic systems can also be modified to gain spatial control over the formation of condensates. Multiple approaches have been developed to do so. In one approach, which localizes condensates to specific genomic regions, core proteins are fused to proteins such as TRF1 or catalytically dead Cas9, which bind specific genomic loci. When oligomerization is trigger by light activation, phase separation is preferentially induced on the specific genomic region which is recognized by fusion protein. Because condensates of the same composition can interact and fuse with each other, if they are tethered to specific regions of the genome, condensates can be used to alter the spatial organization of the genome, which can have effects on gene expression.

=== As biochemical reactors ===
Synthetic condensates offer a way to probe cellular function and organization with high spatial and temporal control, but can also be used to modify or add functionality to the cell. One way this is accomplished is by modifying the condensate networks to include binding sites for other proteins of interest, thus allowing the condensate to serve as a scaffold for protein release or recruitment. These binding sites can be modified to be sensitive to light activation or small molecule addition, thus giving temporal control over the recruitment of a specific protein of interest. By recruiting specific proteins to condensates, reactants can be concentrated to increase reaction rates or sequestered to inhibit reactivity. More importantly, by spatially organizing the proximity of enzymes in a complex pathway, synthetic condensates can be used to direct the metabolic flux of branched reactions. In an extreme example of using RNA-based synthetic organelle TEARS to organize violacine biosynthesis pathway in E. coli, the side reaction that produces deoxychromoviridans over the desired product deoxyviolacine can be abolished completely by TEARs. In addition to protein recruitment, condensates can also be designed which release proteins in response to certain stimuli. In this case, a protein of interest can be fused to a scaffold protein via a photocleavable linker. Upon irradiation, the linker is broken, and the protein is released from the condensate. Using these design principles, proteins can either be released to, or sequestered from, their native environment, allowing condensates to serve as a tool to alter the biochemical activity of specific proteins with a high level of control.

=== As biophysical models ===
Synthetic condensates enable complex investigation of the property of biological condensates in vivo. Using synthetic condensates, researchers showed its strong capability to buffer intracellular concentration or reduce noise. Under non-equilibirum environment of fast-growing bacteria, a synthetic organelle like RNA-based TEARS can in fact reversely amplify the noise by asymmetric division. In the same article, TEARS have been used to recruit multiple components like split GFP and present tunable composition control of biological condensates.

=== Protein Purification ===
A significant application of synthetic biomolecular condensates is in the field of protein purification, offering an alternative to traditional methods like chromatography. The PandaPure technology leverages the principles of LLPS to isolate specific proteins of interest directly within host cells like E. coli. In one example, the researcher harnesses RNA-based TEARS system and co-express the target protein, which is autonomously captured and sorted into these synthetic organelles within the cell. After harvesting the cells, they are lysed to release the organelles, which now contain the concentrated target protein. Finally, in situ tag cleavage is mediated to release pure, tag-free protein from the organelle. This method simplifies the purification process into a single operation that includes tag removal, eliminating the need for columns, resins, or magnetic beads. It significantly reduces manual labor, time, and waste compared to conventional purification techniques.

== Methods to study condensates ==
A number of experimental and computational methods have been developed to examine the physico-chemical properties and underlying molecular interactions of biomolecular condensates. Experimental approaches include phase separation assays using bright-field imaging or fluorescence microscopy, and fluorescence recovery after photobleaching (FRAP), as well as rheological analysis of phase-separated droplets. Computational approaches include coarse-grained molecular dynamics simulations and circuit topology analysis.

=== Coarse-grained molecular models ===
Molecular dynamics and Monte Carlo simulations have been extensively used to gain insights into the formation and the material properties of biomolecular condensates. Although molecular models of different resolution have been employed, modelling efforts have mainly focused on coarse-grained models of intrinsically disordered proteins, wherein amino acid residues are represented by single interaction sites. Compared to more detailed molecular descriptions, residue-level models provide high computational efficiency, which enables simulations to cover the long length and time scales required to study phase separation. Moreover, the resolution of these models is sufficiently detailed to capture the dependence on amino acid sequence of the properties of the system.

Several residue-level models of intrinsically disordered proteins have been developed in recent years. Their common features are (i) the absence of an explicit representation of solvent molecules and salt ions, (ii) a mean-field description of the electrostatic interactions between charged residues (see Debye–Hückel theory), and (iii) a set of "stickiness" parameters which quantify the strength of the attraction between pairs of amino acids. In the development of most residue-level models, the stickiness parameters have been derived from hydrophobicity scales or from a bioinformatic analysis of crystal structures of folded proteins. Further refinement of the parameters has been achieved through iterative procedures which maximize the agreement between model predictions and a set of experiments, or by leveraging data obtained from all-atom molecular dynamics simulations.

Residue-level models of intrinsically disordered proteins have been validated by direct comparison with experimental data, and their predictions have been shown to be accurate across diverse amino acid sequences. Examples of experimental data used to validate the models are radii of gyration of isolated chains and saturation concentrations, which are threshold protein concentrations above which phase separation is observed.

Although intrinsically disordered proteins often play important roles in condensate formation, many biomolecular condensates contain multi-domain proteins constituted by folded domains connected by intrinsically disordered regions. Current residue-level models are only applicable to the study of condensates of intrinsically disordered proteins and nucleic acids. Including an accurate description of the folded domains in these models will considerably widen their applicability.

=== Mechanical analysis of biomolecular condensates ===
To identify liquid-liquid phase separation and formation of condensate liquid droplets, one needs to demonstrate the liquid behaviors (viscoelasticity) of the condensates. Furthermore, mechanical processes are key to condensate related diseases, as pathological changes to condensates can lead to their solidification. Rheological methods are commonly used to demonstrate the liquid behavior of biomolecular condensates. These include active microrheological characterization by means of optical tweezers and scanning probe microscopy.

== See also ==
- List of liquid–liquid phase separation databases
