= Dishevelled binding antagonist of beta catenin 1 =

Developmental protein

DACT1

Identifiers
- Aliases: DACT1, DAPPER, DAPPER1, DPR1, FRODO, HDPR1, THYEX3, dishevelled binding antagonist of beta catenin 1, TBS2
- External IDs: OMIM: 607861; MGI: 1891740; HomoloGene: 9613; GeneCards: DACT1; OMA:DACT1 - orthologs

Gene location (Human)
Chr.	Chromosome 14 (human)
Band	14q23.1	Start	58,633,967 bp
Band	14q23.1	End	58,648,321 bp

Gene location (Mouse)
Chr.	Chromosome 12 (mouse)
Band	12|12 C3	Start	71,356,658 bp
Band	12|12 C3	End	71,366,881 bp
RNA expression pattern
Bgee	Human / Mouse (ortholog); Top expressed in: right coronary artery; gallbladder; ganglionic eminence; ascending aorta; left coronary artery; tibial nerve; cerebellar cortex; cerebellar hemisphere; cartilage tissue; Descending thoracic aorta / Top expressed in: condyle; sciatic nerve; trigeminal ganglion; stroma of kidney; fossa; medial ganglionic eminence; genital tubercle; tail of embryo; abdominal wall; endocardial cushion; More reference expression data
BioGPS	n/a
Gene ontology
Molecular function	beta-catenin binding; protein kinase A binding; histone deacetylase binding; delta-catenin binding; protein binding; protein kinase C binding
Cellular component	cytoplasm; cytosol; synapse; nucleoplasm; cell junction; nucleus; beta-catenin destruction complex
Biological process	regulation of protein stability; positive regulation of protein catabolic process; regulation of Wnt signaling pathway, planar cell polarity pathway; negative regulation of Wnt signaling pathway; regulation of nodal signaling pathway; negative regulation of transcription by RNA polymerase II; Wnt signaling pathway; negative regulation of protein binding; embryonic hindgut morphogenesis; nervous system development; negative regulation of G1/S transition of mitotic cell cycle; multicellular organism development; positive regulation of Wnt signaling pathway; negative regulation of JNK cascade; negative regulation of beta-catenin-TCF complex assembly; neural tube development; positive regulation of protein binding; negative regulation of canonical Wnt signaling pathway; regulation of canonical Wnt signaling pathway; positive regulation of canonical Wnt signaling pathway; regulation of Wnt signaling pathway
Sources:Amigo / QuickGO
Orthologs
Species	Human	Mouse
Entrez	51339	59036
Ensembl	ENSG00000165617	ENSMUSG00000044548
UniProt	Q9NYF0	Q8R4A3
RefSeq (mRNA)	NM_001079520; NM_016651	NM_001190466; NM_021532
RefSeq (protein)	NP_001072988; NP_057735	NP_001177395; NP_067507
Location (UCSC)	Chr 14: 58.63 – 58.65 Mb	Chr 12: 71.36 – 71.37 Mb
PubMed search
- Wikidata
View/Edit Human	View/Edit Mouse

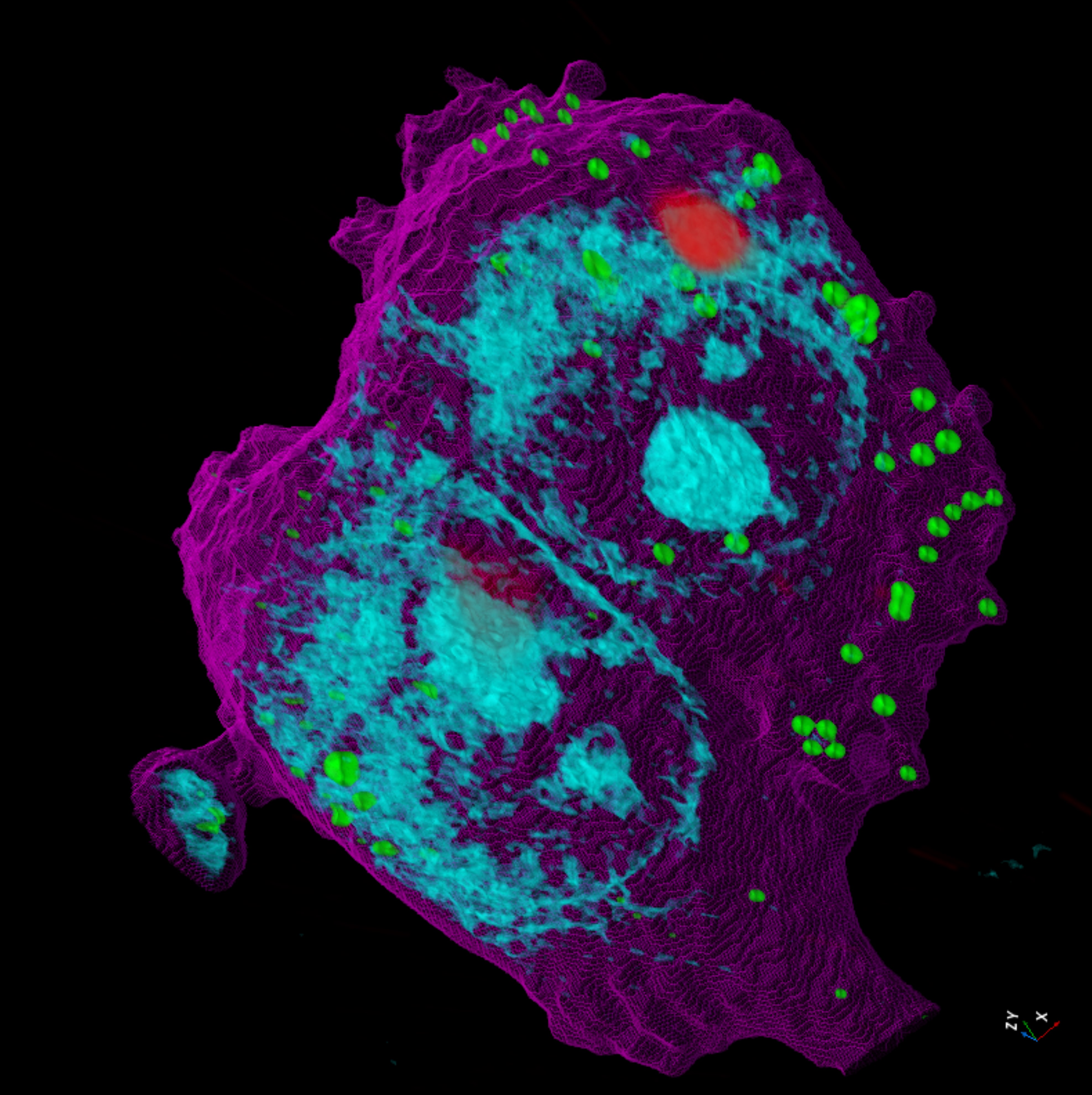
A holotomographic rendering of refractive index across breast cancer cells with Dact1-TdTomato fluorescence superimposed (in red) demonstrates the Dact1-scaffolded biomolecular condensate.

Dishevelled binding antagonist of beta catenin 1 (Dact1, previously known as Dapper, Dpr1, Frodo) is a protein that in humans is encoded by the DACT1 gene. Dact1 was originally described in 2002 as a negative regulator of Wnt signaling by binding and destabilizing Dishevelled. More recent investigation into the molecular function of Dact1 has identified its principal role in the cell as a scaffold to generate membrane-less biomolecular condensates through liquid-liquid phase separation. Mutations in the phase-separating regions of Dact1 lead to Townes-Brock Syndrome 2 while its overexpression is associated with bone metastasis.

== Regulation and function ==
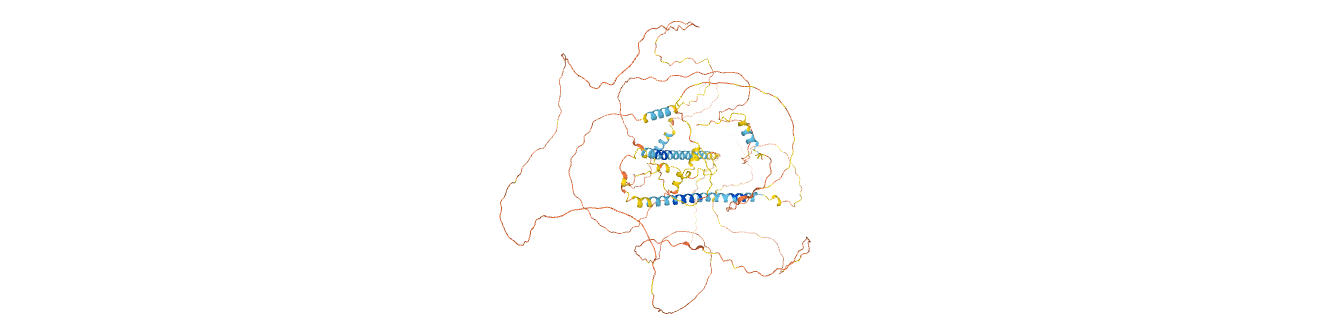
Google DeepMind's Alphafold prediction of the human Dact1 3D structure

Dact1 is regulated by the TGF-β pathway through Smad2/Smad3 binding sites in its promoter region. Dact1 is degraded through the proteasome and is described as a Wnt activator, a Wnt suppressor, or alternately a Wnt-independent regulator of the autophagosome. The Dact1 protein is annotated with 10 intrinsically disordered domains, a nuclear localization sequence, a nuclear export sequence, a PDZ binding domain, and a coiled-coiled domain. AI-based protein folding predictions describe a highly disordered exterior calyx surrounding an ordered interior. Dact1 has been reported to interact with numerous proteins including itself, Dishevelled, p120, LEF, 14-3-3 proteins, Vps34, Miz1, Vangl, and Dact2 through immunoprecipitation studies. More recent studies into the role of Dact1 in forming "Frodosomes", or membrane-less, organelle-like biomolecular condensates, identified a Dact1 protein signature that included many previously identified interactors as well as new proteins such as Casein Kinase 2.

== Health and disease ==
Dact1 is an essential regulator of development through its role in regulating Wnt activity and its deletion is embryonically lethal. Heterozygous mutations in Dact1 cause Townes-Brock Syndrome 2 in humans which is inherited in an autosomal dominant pattern. High levels of Dact1 mRNA predicts worse outcomes in breast cancer bone metastasis and is an essential protein in the bone metastatic cascade.
