= Protoplasma =

Peer-reviewed scientific journal

- Discipline: Biology
- Language: English
- Edited by: P. Nick

Publication details
- History: 1926-present
- Publisher: Springer Science+Business Media
- Frequency: Bimonthly
- Open access: Hybrid
- Impact factor: 3.186 (2021)

Standard abbreviations
- ISO 4: Protoplasma

Indexing
- CODEN: PROTA5
- ISSN: 0033-183X (print); 1615-6102 (web)
- LCCN: 2004233412
- OCLC no.: 6802818

Links
- Journal homepage; Online archive

Protoplasma is a bimonthly peer-reviewed scientific journal covering various aspects of protoplasm research. It is published by Springer Science+Business Media and was established in 1926. The editor-in-chief is P. Nick (University of Karlsruhe).

The journal publishes research articles, reviews, and commentaries related to protoplasm, including its cell structure, signal transduction, biotechnology, and genetic engineering.

== Abstracting and indexing ==
The journal is abstracted and indexed in:

- Biological Abstracts
- BIOSIS Previews
- CAB Abstracts
- Current Contents/Agriculture, Biology & Environmental Sciences
- EBSCO databases
- ProQuest databases
- Science Citation Index Expanded
- Scopus

According to the Journal Citation Reports, the journal has a 2021 impact factor of 3.186.
