= Hao Wu (biochemist) =

Chinese American biochemist

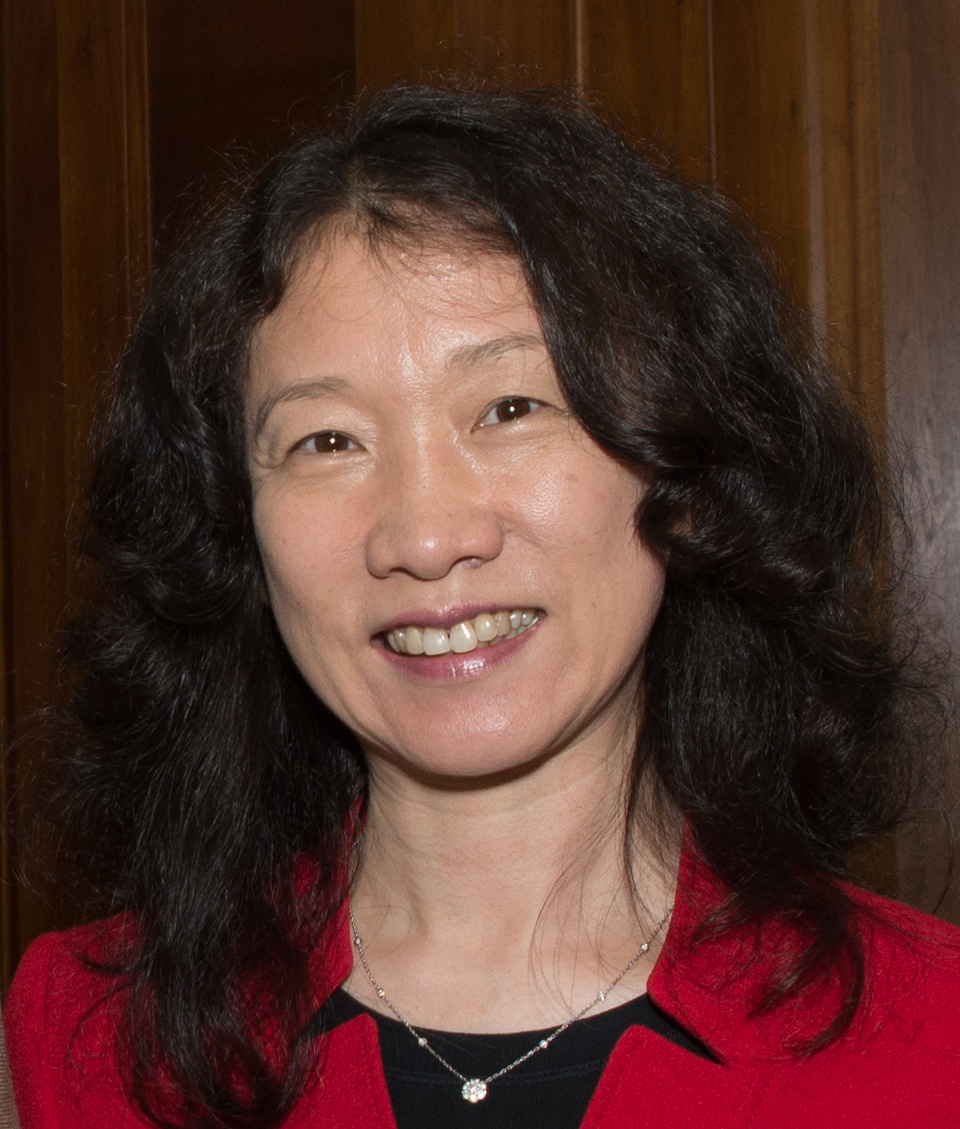
- Occupations: Biochemist; crystallographer; professor
- Title: Asa and Patricia Springer Professor of Structural Biology

Academic background
- Education: Peking Union Medical College; Purdue University

Hao Wu (Chinese: 吴皓; pinyin: Wú Hào) is a Chinese American biochemist and structural biologist. She is the Asa and Patricia Springer Professor of Structural Biology in the Department of Biological Chemistry and Molecular Pharmacology at Harvard Medical School, and a Senior Investigator in the Program in Cellular and Molecular Medicine at Boston Children's Hospital. Her work focuses on molecular mechanisms of signal transduction in cell death and inflammation in innate immunity. She discovered large, higher-order protein assemblies involved in cell death and immune signaling - structures that, unlike traditional protein complexes, form filaments or circular oligomers and often lack fixed stoichiometry. These assemblies illuminate molecular mechanisms of proximity-driven enzyme activation, threshold behavior, signal amplification, noise reduction, and spatiotemporal regulation of signal transduction. They establish a new paradigm in signaling, and reveal mechanistic links to phase separation and biomolecular condensates. Together with Jon Kagan, she later dubbed these structures as supramolecular organizing centers (SMOCs).

As of 2025, Wu has an h-index of 112 and her research has been cited over 50,000 times. She has received the Pew Scholar Award, the Rita Allen Scholar Award, the Margaret Dayhoff Memorial Award, the NYC Mayor's Award for Excellence in Science and Technology, NIH MERIT and Pioneer Awards, and the Purdue University Distinguished Science Alumni Award. She was elected AAAS fellow in 2013, to the National Academy of Sciences in 2015, and to the National Academy of Medicine in 2024.

== Early life and education ==
Wu's grandfather, Chengluo Wu (吴承洛), studied chemical engineering in the U.S. at Lehigh University (where he was known as Chenlott C. Wu). He founded and served as the president of the Chinese Chemical Society. Wu's parents were physics professors in Beijing, China, but were often targeted by the anti-intellectualism of the Chinese Cultural Revolution.

As a high school junior, Wu was selected to the Chinese preparatory camp for the International Mathematical Olympiad, but declined in order to attend a summer program in biology. Wu was admitted from high school to Peking Union Medical College (PUMC) with the highest entering scores in 1982. She received a two and a half-year pre-medical education at Peking University, followed by clinical studies at PUMC. While at PUMC, she engaged in immunology research and developed a deep interest in basic science. In 1987, she attended a scientific lecture in Beijing by Professor Michael Rossmann, a pioneer in X-ray crystallography. Inspired, she chose not to complete her M.D. degree and instead moved to the U.S. in 1988 to pursue a Ph.D. in biochemistry at Purdue University under Rossmann's supervision. She graduated in 1992 with a thesis study on virus structures in which she developed and applied computational approaches to solve these structures. Wu conducted her postdoctoral training with Professor Wayne Hendrickson at Columbia University, where she solved the crystal structure of the four domain extracellular domain of human CD4 and engaged in software development for a crystallographic phasing method called multi-wavelength anomalous dispersion (MAD).

== Career ==
After her postdoctoral work, Wu began her independent academic career in 1997 as an assistant professor in the Department of Biochemistry at Weill Cornell Medical College. She was promoted to associate professor in 2001 and full professor in 2003. She took the risk of establishing a new research direction during her time at Cornell and gained recognition for her work on immune signaling complexes using X-ray crystallography.

In 2012, Wu joined Harvard Medical School and Boston Children's Hospital. There, she was named the inaugural Asa and Patricia Springer Professor of Structural Biology, a chair named after the parents of Dr. Timothy Springer, in recognition of her scientific contributions.

== Research ==
Early on, Wu's lab focused on immune system signaling domains, including death domains, TNF receptor associated factor (TRAF) domains (also known as meprin and TRAF homology (MATH) domain), and RIP homotypic interaction motifs (RHIMs), as well as caspases and kinases, helped explain how immune receptors are activated. It was through these studies that she discovered a recurrent theme in immune signaling proteins: nonstoichiometric homo and hetero-oligomerization that mediates formation of supramolecular or higher-order molecular complexes, also known as signalosomes. Examples of these complexes include helical assembly of death domains such as in the Myddosome, multivalent interactions in TRAFs, and amyloid assembly of RHIMs. Her group has solved the structures of large protein complexes involved in immune pathways, including TRAFs, the Myddosome, IKK-beta, inflammasomes, gasdermins, and synaptic recombination-activating gene (RAG) complexes.

Her work has advanced the concept that signal transduction is mediated by higher-order protein assemblies, which enable proximity-induced enzyme activation, signal amplification, and control of biological noise.

=== Inflammasomes and innate immunity ===
Wu has deeply investigated inflammasomes, which mediate inflammatory responses by activating inflammatory caspases. Inflammatory caspases then process cytokines in the interleukin-1 family to cause their maturation, and cleave gasdermin D (GSDMD) to form pores on the cell surface that release the mature cytokines and induce the lytic cell death pyroptosis.

Her lab lead the field in revealing the structural assembly of several inflammasomes. In 2014, she published the first helical filament structure of a pyrin domain (PYD), a domain central in inflammasome assembly, and subsequently helical filament structures of the caspase recruitment domains (CARD) of inflammasome component proteins. In 2015, her lab solved the first oligomeric disc structure of an inflammasome, that of the NAIP-NLRC4 inflammasome. Since 2019, she revealed detailed step-by-step analysis of the NLRP3 sensor protein in the pathway to its activation, culminating in the inactive NLRP3 cage structure, and active NLRP3 disc structure in complex with the essential cofactor NEK7 and the adaptor ASC. In 2020, using cellular imaging and other approaches, Wu's lab uncovered that the NLRP3 inflammasome speck (mostly using mouse cells) in each cell is formed at the microtubule organizing center (MTOC).

In addition, Wu's lab revealed how the NLRP1 inflammasome protein is suppressed by the cellular protein DPP9 and is activated by the oligomeric UPA and CARD in NLRP1. During the study of the NLRP6 inflammasome, Wu's lab discovered that the interaction of NLRP6 with dsRNA led to phase separation, revealing an additional step of condensate formation that is required for inflammasome assembly and caspase-1 activation.

=== Pyroptosis and Gasdermin Proteins ===
A key focus of Wu's recent research is pyroptosis, a form of programmed inflammatory cell death that can stem from inflammasome activation as well as other pathway activation. In 2016, her lab, together with Judy Lieberman's lab, uncovered that GSDMD interacts with acidic lipids and forms pores on membranes to cause cytokine release and cell lysis.

Using cryo-electron microscopy, she revealed the architecture and mechanism of membrane insertion of GSDMD pores and their roles as a cytokine release conduit. In a 2024 study published in Nature, Wu's team showed that reactive oxygen species (ROS)-dependent S-palmitoylation activates both cleaved and full-length GSDMD. They also discovered that NINJ1 mediates plasma membrane rupture by cleaving and releasing membrane discs, defining the final steps in pyroptotic death. Finally, her lab demonstrated that GSDMD agonism in cancer cells induced immunogenic cell death and profound antitumor immunity, showing the promise of a new way to expand the realm of cancer immunotherapy.

=== Death Domain Superfamily Signaling ===
Wu's research into death domain proteins, such as DD, DED, PYD and CARD, has revealed how these modules form signaling complexes essential for apoptosis, pyroptosis, NF-kB activation, and inflammation.

=== Other structures ===
Her group has solved the structures of other large protein complexes involved in immune pathways, including IKKβ, recombination-activating gene (RAG) complexes, B-cell receptor, and the nuclear pore complex (NPC).

== Awards and honors ==
In 2024, Wu was honored with the Bert and Natalie Vallee Award in Biomedical Science by the American Society for Biochemistry and Molecular Biology (ASBMB) and delivered a lecture on inflammasomes. That same year, she received the prestigious Aminoff Prize from the Royal Swedish Academy of Sciences, which included a symposium held in her honor and a formal prize ceremony and dinner with the King of Sweden.

She was elected to the National Academy of Sciences in 2015, the American Academy of Arts and Sciences in 2021, and the National Academy of Medicine in 2024.

== Selected Publications ==
- Du, Gang; Healy, Liam B.; David, Liron; Walker, Caitlin; El-Baba, Tarick J.; Lutomski, Corinne A.; Goh, Byoungsook; Gu, Bowen; Pi, Xiong; Devant, Pascal; Fontana, Pietro; Dong, Ying; Ma, Xiyu; Miao, Rui; Balasubramanian, Arumugam (2024-06-13). "ROS-dependent S-palmitoylation activates cleaved and intact gasdermin D". Nature. 630 (8016): 437–446. doi:10.1038/s41586-024-07373-5. ISSN 0028-0836. PMC 11283288. PMID 38599239.
- Ruan, Jianbin; Xia, Shiyu; Liu, Xing; Lieberman, Judy; Wu, Hao (2018). "Cryo-EM structure of the gasdermin A3 membrane pore". Nature. 557 (7703): 62–67. doi:10.1038/s41586-018-0058-6. ISSN 0028-0836. PMC 6007975. PMID 29695864.
- Lin, Su-Chang; Lo, Yu-Chih; Wu, Hao (2010). "Helical assembly in the MyD88–IRAK4–IRAK2 complex in TLR/IL-1R signalling". Nature. 465 (7300): 885–890. doi:10.1038/nature09121. ISSN 0028-0836. PMC 2888693. PMID 20485341.
- Li, Jixi; McQuade, Thomas; Siemer, Ansgar B.; Napetschnig, Johanna; Moriwaki, Kenta; Hsiao, Yu-Shan; Damko, Ermelinda; Moquin, David; Walz, Thomas; McDermott, Ann; Chan, Francis Ka-Ming; Wu, Hao (2012). "The RIP1/RIP3 Necrosome Forms a Functional Amyloid Signaling Complex Required for Programmed Necrosis". Cell. 150 (2): 339–350. doi:10.1016/j.cell.2012.06.019. PMC 3664196. PMID 22817896.
- Napetschnig, Johanna; Wu, Hao (2013-05-06). "Molecular Basis of NF-κB Signaling". Annual Review of Biophysics. 42 (1): 443–468. doi:10.1146/annurev-biophys-083012-130338. ISSN 1936-122X. PMC 3678348. PMID 23495970.
- Ye, Hong; Arron, Joseph R.; Lamothe, Betty; Cirilli, Maurizio; Kobayashi, Takashi; Shevde, Nirupama K.; Segal, Deena; Dzivenu, Oki K.; Vologodskaia, Masha; Yim, Mijung; Du, Khoi; Singh, Sujay; Pike, J. Wesley; Darnay, Bryant G.; Choi, Yongwon (2002). "Distinct molecular mechanism for initiating TRAF6 signalling". Nature. 418 (6896): 443–447. doi:10.1038/nature00888. ISSN 0028-0836.
