= Protoplasm =

Alternative term for cytoplasm or cytoplasm and nucleoplasm

Protoplasm (/ˈproʊtəˌplæzəm/; pl. protoplasms) is the part of a cell that is surrounded by a plasma membrane. It is a mixture of small molecules such as ions, monosaccharides, amino acids, and macromolecules such as proteins, polysaccharides, lipids, etc.

In some definitions, it is a general term for the cytoplasm (e.g., Mohl, 1846), but for others, it also includes the nucleoplasm (e.g., Strasburger, 1882). For Sharp (1921), "According to the older usage the extra-nuclear portion of the protoplast [the entire cell, excluding the cell wall] was called ‘protoplasm,’ but the nucleus also is composed of protoplasm, or living substance in its broader sense." The current consensus is to avoid this ambiguity by employing Strasburger's (1882) terms cytoplasm [coined by Kölliker (1863), originally as synonym for protoplasm] and nucleoplasm [term coined by van Beneden (1875), or karyoplasm, used by Flemming (1878)]." The cytoplasm definition of Strasburger excluded the plastids (Chromatoplasm).

Like the nucleus, whether to include the vacuole in the protoplasm concept is controversial.

== Terminology ==
Besides "protoplasm", many other related terms and distinctions were used for the cell contents over time. These were as follows:

- Urschleim (Oken, 1802, 1809),
- Protoplasma (Purkyně, 1840, von Mohl, 1846),
- Primordialschlauch (primordial utricle, von Mohl, 1846),
- sarcode (Dujardin, 1835, 1841),
- Cytoplasma (Kölliker, 1863),
- Hautschicht/Körnerschicht (ectoplasm/endoplasm, Pringsheim, 1854; Hofmeister, 1867),
- Grundsubstanz (ground substance, Cienkowski, 1863),
- metaplasm/protoplasm (Hanstein, 1868),
- deutoplasm/protoplasm (van Beneden, 1870),
- bioplasm (Beale, 1872),
- paraplasm/protoplasm (Kupffer, 1875),
- inter-filar substance theory (Velten, 1876)
- Hyaloplasma (Pfeffer, 1877),
- Protoplast (Hanstein, 1880),
- Enchylema/Hyaloplasma (Hanstein, 1880),
- Kleinkörperchen or Mikrosomen (small bodies or microsomes, Hanstein, 1882),
- paramitome (Flemming, 1882),
- Idioplasma (Nägeli, 1884),
- Zwischensubstanz (inter-alveolar substance, Bütschli, 1892),
- Grundplasma (ground plasma, Schütt, 1895),
- ergastoplasme (Garnier, 1897),
- phaneroplasm/cryptoplasm (Seifriz, 1931),
- cytoplasmic matrix (Munson, 1899; zytoplasmatische Matrix, Bergmann, 1956),
- Protoplasma- oder Zelleinschlüsse (protoplasmic or cellular inclusions, Szymonowicz, 1901),
- kinoplasm/trophoplasm (Strasburger et at., 1912),
- cytosol (Lardy, 1965).

== History ==
The word "protoplasm" comes from the Greek protos for first, and plasma for thing formed or moulded, and was originally used in religious contexts. It was used in 1839 by J. E. Purkinje for the material of the animal embryo. Later, in 1846 Hugo von Mohl redefined the term (also named as Primordialschlauch, "primordial utricle") to refer to the "tough, slimy, granular, semi-fluid" substance within plant cells, to distinguish this from the cell wall and the cell sap (Zellsaft) within the vacuole. Max Schultze in 1861 proposed the "Protoplasm Doctrine" which states that all living cells are made of a living substance called Protoplasm. Thomas Huxley (1869) later referred to it as the "physical basis of life" and considered that the property of life resulted from the distribution of molecules within this substance. The protoplasm became an "epistemic thing". Its composition, however, was mysterious and there was much controversy over what sort of substance it was.

In 1872, Beale created the vitalist term "bioplasm", to contrast with the materialism of Huxley. In 1880, term protoplast was proposed by Hanstein (1880) for the entire cell, excluding the cell wall, and some authors like Julius von Sachs (1882) preferred that name instead of cell.

In 1965, Lardy introduced the term "cytosol", later redefined to refer to the liquid inside cells.

By the time Huxley wrote, a long-standing debate was largely settled over the fundamental unit of life: was it the cell or was it protoplasm? By the late 1860s, the debate was largely settled in favor of protoplasm. The cell was a container for protoplasm, the fundamental and universal material substance of life. Huxley's principal contribution was to establish protoplasm as incompatible with a vitalistic theory of life. Attempts to investigate the origin of life through the creation of synthetic "protoplasm" in the laboratory were not successful.

The idea that protoplasm of eukaryotes is simply divisible into a ground substance called "cytoplasm" and a structural body called the cell nucleus reflects the more primitive knowledge of cell structure that preceded the development of electron microscopy, when it seemed that cytoplasm was a homogeneous fluid and the existence of most sub-cellular compartments, or how cells maintain their shape, was unknown. Today, it is known that the cell contents are structurally very complex and contain multiple organelles, the cytoskeleton and biomolecular condensates. The word protoplasm is mainly divided in to two parts cytoplasm and nucleus.

== Description ==
=== Physical nature ===
Protoplasm is physically translucent, granular slimy, semifluid or viscous. In it, granules of different shapes and sizes are suspended in solution. It may exist in two interchangeable states which are more liquid-like sol state and more solid-like gel state which is like jelly. The constituent molecules are free to move in sol state, while in gel state, the constituent molecules are compactly arranged. Protoplasm becomes opaque when it is heated. It also coagulates on heating. It occurs everywhere in the cell. In eukaryotes, the portion of protoplasm surrounding the cell nucleus is known as the cytoplasm and the portion inside the nucleus as the nucleoplasm. In prokaryotes the material inside the plasma membrane is the bacterial cytoplasm, while in Gram-negative bacteria the region outside the plasma membrane but inside the outer membrane is the periplasm.

=== Chemical composition ===
There are about 30 elements, like carbon, hydrogen, oxygen, phosphorus, sulphur, calcium and many others which are identified in protoplasm of different cells. They form compounds, like water (65–80%), carbohydrates, ions, proteins, lipids, nucleic acids (DNA and RNA), fatty acids, glycerol, nucleotides, nucleosides and minerals. They are living as long as they are part of protoplasm. They are not able to perform functions of life independently. The composition of protoplasm is inconsistent and continuous changes take place in it.

=== Functions ===
Some functions of protoplasm are:

1. It provides place where all life functions occur
2. The cells respond to various stimuli like temperature, light, chemicals, gravitation, pricking, electric shocks and others because of properties of protoplasm.
3. Cyclosis (the streaming movement of protoplasm is known as Cyclosis. It helps in even distribution of various materials in the cells.)

== See also ==
- Chemical evolution
- Membrane
- Symplast

== Cited sources ==
- Hanstein, J. (1880). Das Protoplasma. Heidelberg.
- Sharp, L. W. (1921). Introduction To Cytology. New York: McGraw Hill.
- Wayne, R. (2009). Plant Cell Biology: From Astronomy to Zoology. Amsterdam: Elsevier/Academic Press. ISBN 978-0-08-092127-3.
