= Biotheology =

Biotheology is the synthetic application of understanding of biology to the understanding of God, synthesizing modern biology and traditional religious doctrines.

Scripturally, Biotheology is motivated by, amongst other things, Saint Paul's exposition of the Church as the Body of Christ, likening its form and functions to the form and functions of the human body (1 Cor. 12:12-17), his remarks in Romans (Ro. 1:20), and Jesus' many parables concerning nature.

A key concept is the thought that the Kingdom of God may be understood as an integral part of evolution. Areas of research include questions of the establishment and maintenance of order, of the relationship between spirit and emergence, and of the relationship between sin and natural selection.

== See also ==
- Vitalism
- Biopolitics
- Biopower
- Body politic
- Christian bioethics
- Ecotheology
