= Deutoplasm =

Food particles in the cytoplasm of an ovum or a cell

The deutoplasm comprises the food particles stored in the cytoplasm of an ovum or a cell, as distinguished from protoplasm, the yolk substance. Generally, the deutoplasm accumulates about the nucleus and is heavier than the surrounding cytoplasm. In chicken eggs, the cytoplasm and deutoplasm are separate.

The primary function of the deutoplasm is to provide the developing embryo with additional nutrients, such as vitamins, minerals, proteins and lipids.
