= List of liquid–liquid phase separation databases =

Liquid-liquid phase separation (LLPS) is well defined in the Biomolecular condensate page.

LLPS databases cover different aspects of LLPS phenomena, ranging from cellular location of the Membraneless Organelles (MLOs) to the role of a particular protein/region forming the condensate state. These databases contain manually curated data supported by experimental evidence in the literature and can include related features as presence of protein disorder, low complexity, post-translational modifications, experimental details, phase diagrams, among others.

Table 1
Database	Created	Records	Description - Type of data
PhaSepDB2.0	2019	2957	Aims at collecting proteins that were found in membraneless organelles (MLOs), and organizes its entries according to MLO location. All entries can be classified into three groups depending on the quality of annotation: (i) Reviewed, verified by PhaSepDB curators, (ii) UniProtKB reviewed, pulled from UniProtKB, and (iii) high-throughput, identified by high-throughput experiments - MLO localization/association
MloDisDB	2021	771	Manually curated database, developed by the same research group of PhaSepDB, but focusing on the association between MLOs and diseases - MLO localization/association and diseases
PhaSePro	2019	121	Manually curated database of LLPS drivers, solely based on experimentally verified cases of LLPS - Drivers/Scaffolds
LLPSDB	2019	1182	Collection of in vitro LLPS experiments detailing the outcome and parameters of thousands of experiments -Experiments
DrLLPS	2019	9285	Database of LLPS proteins from nine model organisms - Clients, regulators, drivers/scaffolds

== See also ==
- Biomolecular condensate
- MobiDB database
- Intrinsically disordered proteins
- DisProt database
