= Vitalism =

Idea about the nature of living organisms

Vitalism is an idea that living organisms are differentiated from the non-living by the presence of forces, properties or powers including those which may not be physical or chemical. Varied forms of vitalist theories were held in former times and they are now considered pseudoscientific concepts. (Note: Stéphane Leduc and D'Arcy Thompson (On Growth and Form) published a series of works that in Evelyn Fox Keller's view took on the task of uprooting the remaining vestiges of vitalism, essentially by showing that the principles of physics and chemistry were enough, by themselves, to account for the growth and development of biological form. On the other hand, Michael Ruse notes that D'Arcy Thompson's avoidance of natural selection had an "odor of spirit forces" about it.) Where vitalism explicitly invokes a vital principle, that element is often referred to as the "vital spark", "energy", "élan vital" (coined by vitalist Henri Bergson), "vital force", or "vis vitalis", which some equate with the soul. In the 18th and 19th centuries, vitalism was discussed among biologists, between those belonging to the mechanistic school who felt that the known mechanics of physics would eventually explain the difference between life and non-life and vitalists who argued that the processes of life could not be reduced to a mechanistic process. Vitalist biologists such as Johannes Reinke proposed testable hypotheses meant to show inadequacies with mechanistic explanations, but their experiments failed to provide support for vitalism. Biologists now consider vitalism in this sense to have been refuted by empirical evidence, and hence regard it either as a superseded scientific theory, or as a pseudoscience since the mid-20th century.

Vitalism has a long history in medical philosophies: many traditional healing practices posited that disease results from some imbalance in vital forces.

== History ==
=== Ancient philosophies ===
The notion that bodily functions are due to a vitalistic principle existing in all living creatures has roots going back at least to ancient Egypt. In Greek philosophy, the Milesian school proposed natural explanations deduced from materialism and mechanism. However, by the time of Lucretius, this account was supplemented, (for example, by the unpredictable clinamen of Epicurus), and in Stoic physics, the pneuma assumed the role of logos. Galen believed the lungs draw pneuma from the air, which the blood communicates throughout the body.

=== Jainism ===
Vitalism is an aspect of Jain philosophy. The Tattvarthsutra by Umaswati states that the universe is made up of six eternal substances: sentient beings or souls (jīva), non-sentient substance or matter (pudgala), principle of motion (dharma), the principle of rest (adharma), space (ākāśa) and time (kāla). The Sarvārthasiddhi by Pujyapada further divides the Jiva into the amount of vitalities of the sense possessed.

=== Medieval ===
In Europe, medieval physics was influenced by the idea of pneuma, helping to shape later aether theories.

=== Early modern ===
Vitalists included English anatomist Francis Glisson (1597–1677) and the Italian doctor Marcello Malpighi (1628–1694). Caspar Friedrich Wolff (1733–1794) is considered to be the father of epigenesis in embryology, that is, he marks the point when embryonic development began to be described in terms of the proliferation of cells rather than the incarnation of a preformed soul. However, this degree of empirical observation was not matched by a mechanistic philosophy: in his Theoria Generationis (1759), he tried to explain the emergence of the organism by the actions of a vis essentialis (an organizing, formative force). Carl Reichenbach (1788–1869) later developed the theory of Odic force, a form of life-energy that permeates living things.

In the 17th century, modern science responded to Newton's action at a distance and the mechanism of Cartesian dualism with vitalist theories: that whereas the chemical transformations undergone by non-living substances are reversible, so-called "organic" matter is permanently altered by chemical transformations (such as cooking).

As worded by Charles Birch and John B. Cobb, "the claims of the vitalists came to the fore again" in the 18th century: "Georg Ernst Stahl's followers were active as were others, such as the physician genius Francis Xavier Bichat of the Hotel Dieu." However, "Bichat moved from the tendency typical of the French vitalistic tradition to progressively free himself from metaphysics in order to combine with hypotheses and theories which accorded to the scientific criteria of physics and chemistry." John Hunter recognised "a 'living principle' in addition to mechanics."

Johann Friedrich Blumenbach was influential in establishing epigenesis in the life sciences in 1781 with his publication of Über den Bildungstrieb und das Zeugungsgeschäfte. Blumenbach cut up freshwater Hydra and established that the removed parts would regenerate. He inferred the presence of a "formative drive" (Bildungstrieb) in living matter. But he pointed out that this name,

like names applied to every other kind of vital power, of itself, explains nothing: it serves merely to designate a peculiar power formed by the combination of the mechanical principle with that which is susceptible of modification.

=== 19th century ===
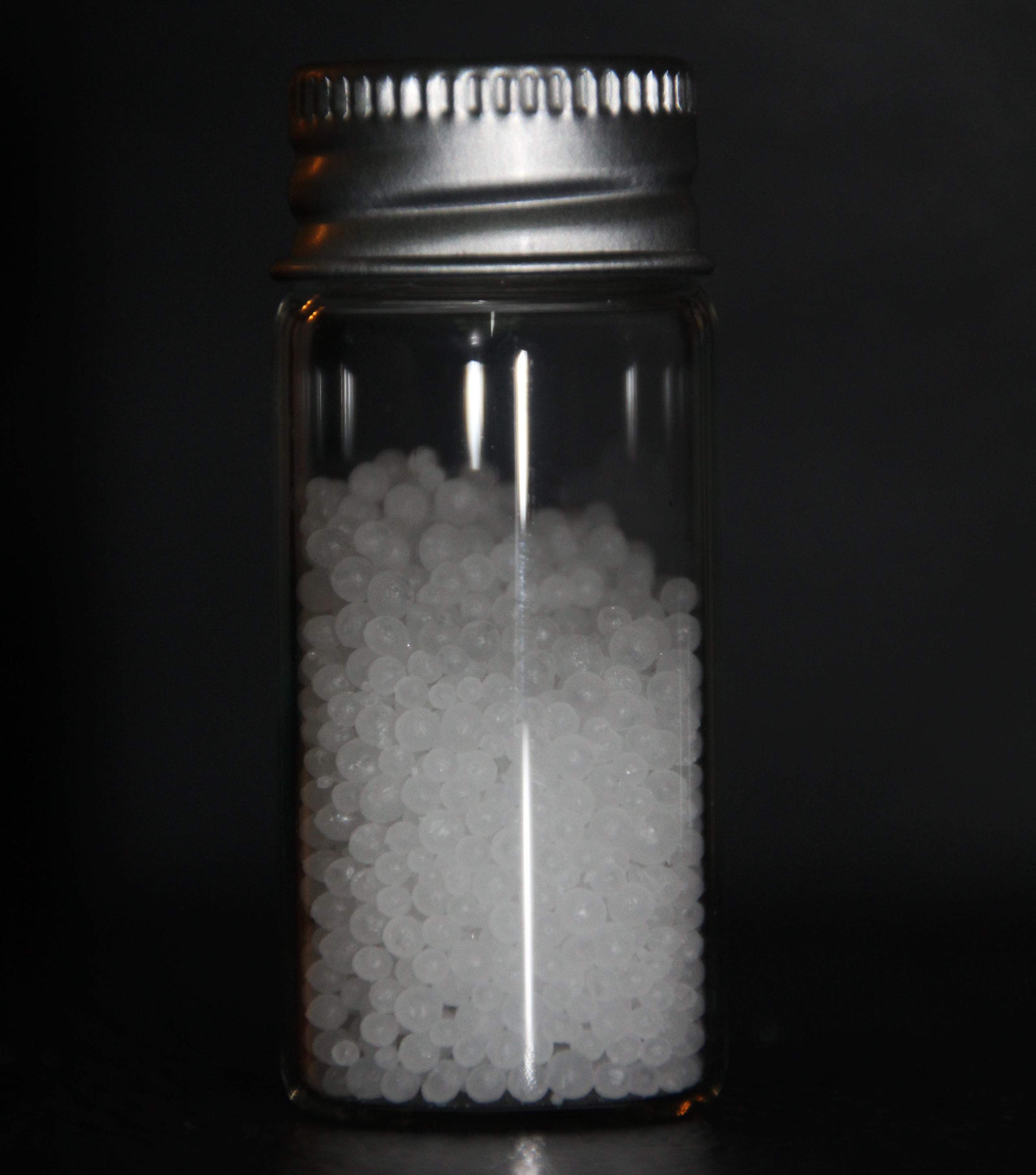
The synthesis of urea in the early 19th century from inorganic compounds was counterevidence for the vitalist hypothesis that only organisms could make the components of living things.

Jöns Jakob Berzelius, one of the early 19th century founders of modern chemistry, argued that a regulative force must exist within living matter to maintain its functions. Berzelius contended that compounds could be distinguished by whether they required any organisms in their synthesis (organic compounds) or whether they did not (inorganic compounds). Vitalist chemists predicted that organic materials could not be synthesized from inorganic components, but Friedrich Wöhler synthesised urea from inorganic components in 1828. However, contemporary accounts do not support the common belief that vitalism died when Wöhler made urea. This Wöhler Myth, as historian Peter Ramberg called it, originated from a popular history of chemistry published in 1931, which, "ignoring all pretense of historical accuracy, turned Wöhler into a crusader who made attempt after attempt to synthesize a natural product that would refute vitalism and lift the veil of ignorance, until 'one afternoon the miracle happened'". (Note: In 1845, Adolph Kolbe succeeded in making acetic acid from inorganic compounds, and in the 1850s, Marcellin Berthelot repeated this feat for numerous organic compounds. In retrospect, Wöhler's work was the beginning of the end of Berzelius's vitalist hypothesis, but only in retrospect, as Ramberg had shown.)

Between 1833 and 1844, Johannes Peter Müller wrote a book on physiology called Handbuch der Physiologie, which became the leading textbook in the field for much of the nineteenth century. The book showed Müller's commitments to vitalism; he questioned why organic matter differs from inorganic, then proceeded to chemical analyses of the blood and lymph. He describes in detail the circulatory, lymphatic, respiratory, digestive, endocrine, nervous, and sensory systems in a wide variety of animals but explains that the presence of a soul makes each organism an indivisible whole. He claimed that the behaviour of light and sound waves showed that living organisms possessed a life-energy for which physical laws could never fully account.

Louis Pasteur (1822–1895) after his famous rebuttal of spontaneous generation, performed several experiments that he felt supported vitalism. According to Bechtel, Pasteur "fitted fermentation into a more general programme describing special reactions that only occur in living organisms. These are irreducibly vital phenomena." Rejecting the claims of Berzelius, Liebig, Traube and others that fermentation resulted from chemical agents or catalysts within cells, Pasteur concluded that fermentation was a "vital action".

=== 20th century ===
Hans Driesch (1867–1941) interpreted his experiments as showing that life is not run by physicochemical laws. His main argument was that when one cuts up an embryo after its first division or two, each part grows into a complete adult. Driesch's reputation as an experimental biologist deteriorated as a result of his vitalistic theories, which scientists have seen since his time as pseudoscience. Vitalism is a superseded scientific hypothesis, and the term is sometimes used as a pejorative epithet. Ernst Mayr (1904–2005) wrote:

It would be ahistorical to ridicule vitalists. When one reads the writings of one of the leading vitalists like Driesch one is forced to agree with him that many of the basic problems of biology simply cannot be solved by a philosophy as that of Descartes, in which the organism is simply considered a machine... The logic of the critique of the vitalists was impeccable.

Vitalism has become so disreputable a belief in the last fifty years that no biologist alive today would want to be classified as a vitalist. Still, the remnants of vitalist thinking can be found in the work of Alistair Hardy, Sewall Wright, and Charles Birch, who seem to believe in some sort of nonmaterial principle in organisms.

Other vitalists included Johannes Reinke and Oscar Hertwig. Reinke used the word neovitalism to describe his work, claiming that it would eventually be verified through experimentation, and that it was an improvement over the other vitalistic theories. The work of Reinke influenced Carl Jung.

John Scott Haldane adopted an anti-mechanist approach to biology and an idealist philosophy early on in his career. Haldane saw his work as a vindication of his belief that teleology was an essential concept in biology. His views became widely known with his first book Mechanism, life and personality in 1913. Haldane borrowed arguments from the vitalists to use against mechanism; however, he was not a vitalist. Haldane treated the organism as fundamental to biology: "we perceive the organism as a self-regulating entity", "every effort to analyze it into components that can be reduced to a mechanical explanation violates this central experience". The work of Haldane was an influence on organicism. Haldane stated that a purely mechanist interpretation could not account for the characteristics of life. Haldane wrote a number of books in which he attempted to show the invalidity of both vitalism and mechanist approaches to science. Haldane explained:

We must find a different theoretical basis of biology, based on the observation that all the phenomena concerned tend towards being so coordinated that they express what is normal for an adult organism.

—

By 1931, biologists had "almost unanimously abandoned vitalism as an acknowledged belief."

=== 21st century ===
American philosophy professor Leonard Lawlor wrote a chapter for the 2007 book Columbia Companion to Twentieth-Century Philosophies detailing the "neo-vitalism" structure in 20th century continental philosophy.

Moreover, Benjamin Prinz and Henning Schmidgen argue that an undercurrent they call "vitalist Marxism" ran through 20th century continental philosophy. Drawing in particular on the work of Georges Canguilhem, they describe an interpretation of Marxism in which life is understood not as a metaphysical substance but as a normative and self-organizing activity. Within this framework, the concept of life in the work of Karl Marx is reconsidered beyond its function as the biological basis of labor power and instead treated as a source of critique and resistance within capitalist modernity. This perspective also advances an “organological” account of technology, interpreting tools and machines as extensions or “organs” of living beings rather than as purely mechanical entities opposed to life. Vitalist Marxism thus links historical materialism with contemporary ecological and political concerns centered on the defense and transformation of living conditions.

== Emergentism ==
Contemporary science and engineering sometimes describe emergent processes, in which the properties of a system cannot be fully described in terms of the properties of the constituents. This may be because the properties of the constituents are not fully understood, or because the interactions between the individual constituents are important for the behavior of the system.

Whether emergence should be grouped with traditional vitalist concepts is a matter of semantic controversy. (Note: See; briefly, some philosophers see emergentism as midway between traditional spiritual vitalism and mechanistic reductionism; others argue that, structurally, emergentism is equivalent to vitalism. See also.) According to Emmeche et al. (1997):

On the one hand, many scientists and philosophers regard emergence as having only a pseudo-scientific status. On the other hand, new developments in physics, biology, psychology, and cross-disciplinary fields such as cognitive science, artificial life, and the study of non-linear dynamical systems have focused strongly on the high level 'collective behaviour' of complex systems, which is often said to be truly emergent, and the term is increasingly used to characterize such systems.

== Mesmerism ==
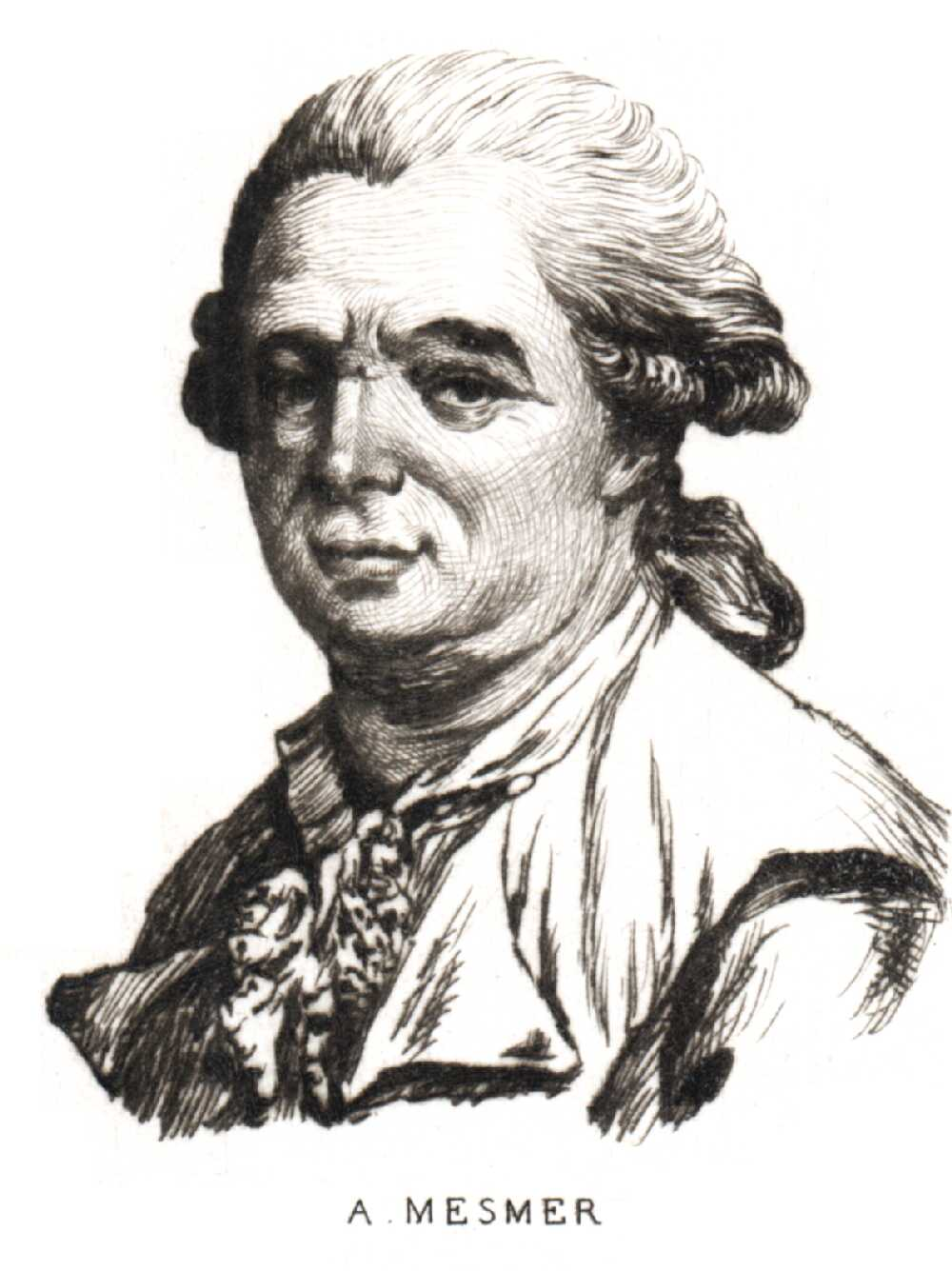
Franz Mesmer proposed the vitalist force of magnétisme animal in animals with breath.

A popular vitalist theory of the 18th century was "animal magnetism", in the theories of Franz Mesmer (1734–1815). However, the use of the (conventional) English term animal magnetism to translate Mesmer's magnétisme animal can be misleading for three reasons:

- Mesmer chose his term to clearly distinguish his variant of magnetic force from those referred to, at that time, as mineral magnetism, cosmic magnetism and planetary magnetism.
- Mesmer felt that this particular force/power only resided in the bodies of humans and animals.
- Mesmer chose the word "animal," for its root meaning (from Latin animus="breath") specifically to identify his force as a quality that belonged to all creatures with breath; viz., the animate beings: humans and animals.

Mesmer's ideas became so influential that King Louis XVI of France appointed two commissions to investigate mesmerism; one was led by Joseph-Ignace Guillotin, the other, led by Benjamin Franklin, included Bailly and Lavoisier. The commissioners learned about Mesmeric theory, and saw its patients fall into fits and trances. In Franklin's garden, a patient was led to each of five trees, one of which had been "mesmerized"; he hugged each in turn to receive the "vital fluid," but fainted at the foot of a 'wrong' one. At Lavoisier's house, four normal cups of water were held before a "sensitive" woman; the fourth produced convulsions, but she calmly swallowed the mesmerized contents of a fifth, believing it to be plain water. The commissioners concluded that "the fluid without imagination is powerless, whereas imagination without the fluid can produce the effects of the fluid."

== Medical philosophies ==
Vitalism has a long history in medical philosophies: many traditional healing practices posited that disease results from some imbalance in vital forces. One example of a similar notion in Africa is the Yoruba concept of ase. In the European tradition founded by Hippocrates, these vital forces were associated with the four temperaments and humours. Multiple Asian traditions posited an imbalance or blocking of qi or prana. Amongst unterritorialized traditions such as religions and arts, forms of vitalism continue to exist as philosophical positions or as memorial tenets.

Complementary and alternative medicine therapies include energy therapies, associated with vitalism, especially biofield therapies such as therapeutic touch, Reiki, external qi, chakra healing and SHEN therapy. In these therapies, the "subtle energy" field of a patient is manipulated by a practitioner. The subtle energy is held to exist beyond the electromagnetic energy produced by the heart and brain. Beverly Rubik describes the biofield as a "complex, dynamic, extremely weak EM field within and around the human body...."

The founder of homeopathy, Samuel Hahnemann, promoted an immaterial, vitalistic view of disease: "...they are solely spirit-like (dynamic) derangements of the spirit-like power (the vital principle) that animates the human body." The view of disease as a dynamic disturbance of the immaterial and dynamic vital force is taught in many homeopathic colleges and constitutes a fundamental principle for many contemporary practising homeopaths.

== Criticism ==
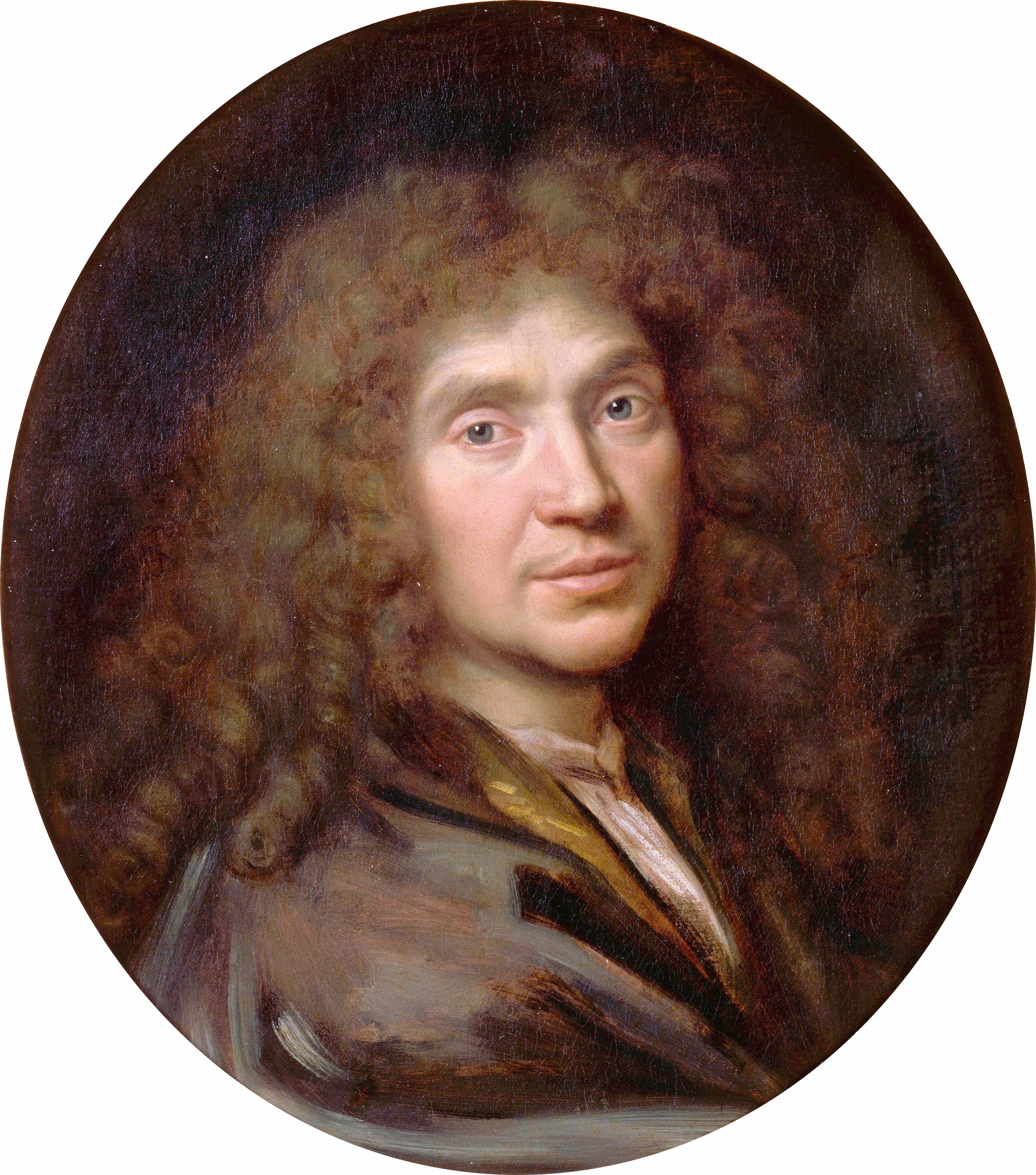
The 17th century French playwright Molière mocked vitalism in his 1673 play Le Malade imaginaire.

Vitalism has sometimes been criticized as begging the question by inventing a name. Molière had famously parodied this fallacy in Le Malade imaginaire, where a quack "answers" the question of "Why does opium cause sleep?" with "Because of its dormitive virtue (i.e., soporific power)." Thomas Henry Huxley compared vitalism to stating that water is the way it is because of its "aquosity". His grandson Julian Huxley in 1926 compared "vital force" or élan vital to explaining a railroad locomotive's operation by its élan locomotif ("locomotive force").

Another criticism, which predates the fields of organic chemistry and developmental biology, is that vitalists have failed to rule out mechanistic explanations. In 1912, Jacques Loeb published The Mechanistic Conception of Life, in which he described experiments on how a sea urchin could have a pin for its father, as Bertrand Russell put it (Religion and Science). He offered this challenge:

... we must either succeed in producing living matter artificially, or we must find the reasons why this is impossible.

Loeb addressed vitalism more explicitly:

It is, therefore, unwarranted to continue the statement that in addition to the acceleration of oxidations the beginning of individual life is determined by the entrance of a metaphysical "life principle" into the egg; and that death is determined, aside from the cessation of oxidations, by the departure of this "principle" from the body. In the case of the evaporation of water we are satisfied with the explanation given by the kinetic theory of gases and do not demand that to repeat a well-known jest of Huxley the disappearance of the "aquosity" be also taken into consideration.

Bechtel states that vitalism "is often viewed as unfalsifiable, and therefore a pernicious metaphysical doctrine." For many scientists, "vitalist" theories were unsatisfactory "holding positions" on the pathway to mechanistic understanding. In 1967, Francis Crick, the co-discoverer of the structure of DNA, stated "And so to those of you who may be vitalists I would make this prophecy: what everyone believed yesterday, and you believe today, only cranks will believe tomorrow."

While many vitalistic theories have in fact been falsified, notably Mesmerism, the pseudoscientific retention of untested and untestable theories continues to this day. Alan Sokal published an analysis of the wide acceptance among professional nurses of "scientific theories" of spiritual healing. Use of a technique called therapeutic touch was especially reviewed by Sokal, who concluded, "nearly all the pseudoscientific systems to be examined in this essay are based philosophically on vitalism" and added that "Mainstream science has rejected vitalism since at least the 1930s, for a plethora of good reasons that have only become stronger with time."

Joseph C. Keating, Jr. discusses vitalism's past and present roles in chiropractic and calls vitalism "a form of bio-theology." He further explains that:

Vitalism is that rejected tradition in biology which proposes that life is sustained and explained by an unmeasurable, intelligent force or energy. The supposed effects of vitalism are the manifestations of life itself, which in turn are the basis for inferring the concept in the first place. This circular reasoning offers pseudo-explanation, and may deceive us into believing we have explained some aspect of biology when in fact we have only labeled our ignorance. 'Explaining an unknown (life) with an unknowable (Innate),' suggests chiropractor Joseph Donahue, 'is absurd'."

Keating views vitalism as incompatible with scientific thinking:

Chiropractors are not unique in recognizing a tendency and capacity for self-repair and auto-regulation of human physiology. But we surely stick out like a sore thumb among professions which claim to be scientifically based by our unrelenting commitment to vitalism. So long as we propound the 'One cause, one cure' rhetoric of Innate, we should expect to be met by ridicule from the wider health science community. Chiropractors can't have it both ways. Our theories cannot be both dogmatically held vitalistic constructs and be scientific at the same time. The purposiveness, consciousness and rigidity of the Palmers' Innate should be rejected.

Keating also mentions Skinner's viewpoint:

Vitalism has many faces and has sprung up in many areas of scientific inquiry. Psychologist B.F. Skinner, for example, pointed out the irrationality of attributing behavior to mental states and traits. Such 'mental way stations,' he argued, amount to excess theoretical baggage which fails to advance cause-and-effect explanations by substituting an unfathomable psychology of 'mind'.

According to Williams, "[t]oday, vitalism is one of the ideas that form the basis for many pseudoscientific health systems that claim that illnesses are caused by a disturbance or imbalance of the body's vital force." "Vitalists claim to be scientific, but in fact they reject the scientific method with its basic postulates of cause and effect and of provability. They often regard subjective experience to be more valid than objective material reality."

Victor Stenger states that the term "bioenergetics" "is applied in biochemistry to refer to the readily measurable exchanges of energy within organisms, and between organisms and the environment, which occur by normal physical and chemical processes. This is not, however, what the new vitalists have in mind. They imagine the bioenergetic field as a holistic living force that goes beyond reductionist physics and chemistry."

Such a field is sometimes explained as electromagnetic, though some advocates also make confused appeals to quantum physics. Joanne Stefanatos states that "The principles of energy medicine originate in quantum physics." Stenger offers several explanations as to why this line of reasoning may be misplaced. He explains that energy exists in discrete packets called quanta. Energy fields are composed of their component parts and so only exist when quanta are present. Therefore, energy fields are not holistic, but are rather a system of discrete parts that must obey the laws of physics. This also means that energy fields are not instantaneous. These facts of quantum physics place limitations on the infinite, continuous field that is used by some theorists to describe so-called "human energy fields". Stenger continues, explaining that the effects of EM forces have been measured by physicists as accurately as one part in a billion and there is yet to be any evidence that living organisms emit a unique field.

Vitalistic thinking has been identified in the naive biological theories of children: "Recent experimental results show that a majority of preschoolers tend to choose vitalistic explanations as most plausible. Vitalism, together with other forms of intermediate causality, constitute unique causal devices for naive biology as a core domain of thought."

== See also ==
- Animal magnetism – Pseudoscientific theory about force in living things
- Argument from ignorance – Informal fallacy
- Henri Bergson – French philosopher (1859–1941)
- Georges Canguilhem – French philosopher (1904–1995)
- Egregore – Occult concept
- Élan vital – Hypothetical explanation for evolution and development of organisms
- Emergentism – Philosophical view concerning consiousness
- Energy (esotericism) – Term used in esoteric forms of spirituality and alternative medicine
- Energy medicine – Pseudoscientific alternative medicine
- Etheric body – Concept in neo-Theosophy
- Holism in science – Approach to research that emphasizes the study of complex systems
- Homeopathy – Pseudoscientific system of alternative medicine
- Hylozoism – Philosophical doctrine which holds that all matter is alive
- Irreducible complexity – Argument by proponents of intelligent design
- Lebensphilosophie – German philosophical movement
- Mana (Oceanian cultures) – Life force energy, power, effectiveness, and prestige in Pacific Island culture
- Manitou – Fundamental life force in Algonquian mythologies in North America
- Medicus curat, natura sanat – Medical aphorism ("the physician treats, nature heals")
- Mind–body dualism – Philosophical view that consiousness and the body are fundamentally different
- Montpellier vitalism – Medical and philosophical school of thought
- Morphic resonance (Rupert Sheldrake) – English author and parapsychological researcher (born 1942)
- Odic force – Hypothetical vital energy or life force
- Orenda – Theorized spiritual power
- Orgone – Pseudoscientific concept by Wilhelm Reich
- Orthogenesis – Hypothesis that organisms have an innate tendency to evolve towards some goal
- Prana – Sanskrit meaning "life force" or "vital principle"
- Protoscience – Research field that may become a science
- Qi – Vital force in traditional Chinese philosophy
- Ratiovitalism (José Ortega y Gasset) – Spanish philosopher and essayist (1883–1955)
- Royal Commission on Animal Magnetism – 1784 French scientific bodies' investigations involving systematic controlled trials
- Spirit (animating force) – Vital principle or animating force within all living things
- Theory of impetus – Theory on projectile motion
- Vis medicatrix naturae – Latin phrase affirming the body's self-healing nature
- Vital materialism (Jane Bennett) – American political theorist (born 1957)
- Vitality – Capacity to live, grow, or develop

== Sources ==
- Birch, Charles; Cobb, John B (1985). The Liberation of Life: From the Cell to the Community. CUP Archive. ISBN 9780521315142.
- History and Philosophy of the Life Sciences. Vol. 29. 2007.
