= VANGL2 =

Protein-coding gene in humans

Identifiers
- Aliases: VANGL2, LPP1, LTAP, STB1, STBM, STBM1, VANGL planar cell polarity protein 2
- External IDs: OMIM: 600533; MGI: 2135272; GeneCards: VANGL2

Gene location (Human)
Chr.	Chromosome 1 (human)
Band	1q23.2	Start	160,400,564 bp
Band	1q23.2	End	160,428,670 bp

Gene location (Mouse)
Chr.	Chromosome 1 (mouse)
Band	1 H3|1 79.54 cM	Start	171,828,527 bp
Band	1 H3|1 79.54 cM	End	171,856,011 bp
RNA expression pattern
Bgee	Human / Mouse (ortholog); Top expressed in: ganglionic eminence; buccal mucosa cell; ventricular zone; skin of arm; skin of abdomen; skin of leg; skin of thigh; vagina; minor salivary glands; cerebellar hemisphere / Top expressed in: ventricular zone; molar; ganglionic eminence; tail of embryo; neural plate; genital tubercle; neural groove; lip; neural fold; medial ganglionic eminence; More reference expression data
BioGPS	n/a
Gene ontology
Molecular function	protein binding
Cellular component	integral component of membrane; lateral plasma membrane; membrane; cell-cell junction; plasma membrane; cell pole; stress fiber; basolateral plasma membrane; apical plasma membrane; COPII-coated ER to Golgi transport vesicle; cell periphery
Biological process	hair follicle development; dopaminergic neuron axon guidance; cochlea development; planar dichotomous subdivision of terminal units involved in lung branching morphogenesis; non-canonical Wnt signaling pathway; regulation of establishment of planar polarity; lateral sprouting involved in lung morphogenesis; inner ear receptor cell stereocilium organization; regulation of actin cytoskeleton organization; somatic stem cell population maintenance; convergent extension involved in axis elongation; orthogonal dichotomous subdivision of terminal units involved in lung branching morphogenesis; positive regulation of JUN kinase activity; muscular septum morphogenesis; serotonergic neuron axon guidance; establishment of planar polarity; membranous septum morphogenesis; somatic stem cell division; planar cell polarity pathway involved in heart morphogenesis; heparan sulfate proteoglycan biosynthetic process; wound healing; glomerulus development; establishment of body hair planar orientation; planar cell polarity pathway involved in axis elongation; establishment of planar polarity involved in neural tube closure; planar cell polarity pathway involved in neural tube closure; multicellular organism development; heart looping; Wnt signaling pathway, planar cell polarity pathway; regulation of Wnt signaling pathway; neural tube closure; inner ear receptor cell development; cochlea morphogenesis; apical protein localization; Rho protein signal transduction; establishment or maintenance of epithelial cell apical/basal polarity; kidney morphogenesis; cell migration involved in kidney development; post-anal tail morphogenesis; convergent extension involved in neural plate elongation; convergent extension involved in organogenesis; anterior/posterior pattern specification; digestive tract morphogenesis; planar cell polarity pathway involved in axon guidance; non-motile cilium assembly
Sources:Amigo / QuickGO
Orthologs
Databases	NCBI: entry; OMA: entry
Species	Human	Mouse
Entrez	57216	93840
Ensembl	ENSG00000162738	ENSMUSG00000026556
UniProt	Q9ULK5	Q91ZD4
RefSeq (mRNA)	NM_020335	NM_033509
RefSeq (protein)	NP_065068	NP_277044
Location (UCSC)	Chr 1: 160.4 – 160.43 Mb	Chr 1: 171.83 – 171.86 Mb
PubMed search
- Wikidata
View/Edit Human	View/Edit Mouse

VANGL planar cell polarity protein 2 is a protein that in humans is encoded by the VANGL2 gene.

== Function ==
The protein encoded by the VANGL2 gene is a membrane protein involved in the regulation of planar cell polarity, especially in the stereociliary bundles of the cochlea. The encoded protein transmits directional signals to individual cells or groups of cells in epithelial sheets. This protein is also involved in the development of the neural plate. [provided by RefSeq, Sep 2011].
