= Signalosome =

Signalosomes are large supramolecular protein complexes that undergo clustering (oligomerisation or polymerisation) and/or colloidal phase separation to form biomolecular condensates that increase the local concentration and signalling activity of the individual components. They are an example of molecular self-assembly and self-organisation in cell biology.

== Examples ==
Wnt signalosome: Transduction of Wnt signals from the plasma membrane depends on clustering of LRP6 receptors with Dishevelled (Dvl) proteins to recruit the Axin complex for inactivation.

B-cell receptor (BCR) signalosome: The B-cell receptor (BCR) binds antigen and undergoes clustering to induce signal transduction.

T-cell receptor (TCR) signalosome: Antigen presentation to T-cells is recognised by the T-cell receptor (TCR), which initiates clustering and activation of downstream signalling to induce T-cell responses.

COP9 signalosome: Catalyses the hydrolysis of NEDD8 protein from the Cullin subunit of Cullin-RING ubiquitin ligases (CRL). Therefore, it is responsible for CRL deneddylation – at the same time, it is able to bind deneddylated cullin-RING complex and retain them in deactivated form. COP9 signalosome thus serves as a sole deactivator of CRLs.

RIP1/RIP3 Necrosome: A signalling complex involved in necrotic cell death.

Inflammasomes: The AIM2 and NLRP3 inflammasomes are filamentous assemblies that elicit host defense inside cells by activating caspase-1 for cytokine maturation and cell death.
