= Cytoplasm =

All of the contents of a cell including organelles but excluding the nucleus

Cell biology
- Animal cell diagram
- Components of a typical animal cell: 1. Nucleolus; 2. Nucleus; 3. Ribosome (dots as part of 5); 4. Vesicle; 5. Rough endoplasmic reticulum 6. Golgi apparatus (or, Golgi body); 7. Cytoskeleton; 8. Smooth endoplasmic reticulum 9. Mitochondrion; 10. Vacuole; 11. Cytosol (fluid that contains organelles; with which, comprises cytoplasm); 12. Lysosome; 13. Centrosome; 14. Cell membrane

The cytoplasm is all the material within a eukaryotic or prokaryotic cell, enclosed by the cell membrane, including the organelles and excluding the nucleus in eukaryotic cells. The material inside the nucleus of a eukaryotic cell and contained within the nuclear membrane is termed the nucleoplasm. The main components of the cytoplasm are the cytosol (a gel-like substance), the cell's internal sub-structures, and various cytoplasmic inclusions. The cytoplasm is about 80% water and is usually colorless.

The cytosol or cytoplasmic matrix or groundplasm, remains after the exclusion of the cell organelles and cytoplasmic inclusions. Microscopically it is a highly complex, polyphasic system in which all resolvable cytoplasmic elements are suspended, including the larger organelles such as the ribosomes, mitochondria, plant plastids, lipid droplets, and vacuoles.

Many cellular activities take place within the cytoplasm, such as many metabolic pathways, including glycolysis, photosynthesis, and processes such as cell division. The concentrated inner area is called the endoplasm and the outer layer is called the cell cortex, or ectoplasm.

Movement of calcium ions in and out of the cytoplasm is a signaling activity for metabolic processes.

In large animal and plant cells, amoebae and slime molds, movement of the cytoplasm around organelles and vacuoles is known as cytoplasmic streaming.

== History ==
The term was introduced by Rudolf von Kölliker in 1863, originally as a synonym for protoplasm, but later it has come to mean the cell substance and organelles outside the nucleus.

There has been certain disagreement on the definition of cytoplasm, as some authors prefer to exclude from it some organelles, especially the vacuoles and sometimes the plastids.

== Physical nature ==
It remains uncertain how the various components of the cytoplasm interact to allow movement of organelles while maintaining the cell's structure. The flow of cytoplasmic components plays an important role in many cellular functions which are dependent on the permeability of the cytoplasm. An example of such function is cell signalling, a process which is dependent on the manner in which signaling molecules are allowed to diffuse across the cell. While small signaling molecules like calcium ions are able to diffuse with ease, larger molecules and subcellular structures often require aid in moving through the cytoplasm. The irregular dynamics of such particles have given rise to various theories on the nature of the cytoplasm.

=== As a sol-gel ===
There has long been evidence that the cytoplasm behaves like a sol-gel. It is thought that the component molecules and structures of the cytoplasm behave at times like a disordered colloidal solution (sol) and at other times like an integrated network, forming a solid mass (gel). This theory thus proposes that the cytoplasm exists in distinct fluid and solid phases depending on the level of interaction between cytoplasmic components, which may explain the differential dynamics of different particles observed moving through the cytoplasm. A paper suggested that at length scale smaller than 100 nm, the cytoplasm acts like a liquid, while in a larger length scale, it acts like a gel. Two-phase system Cytoplasmic rheology can be described using a poroelastic model, treating the cytoplasm as a biphasic material. This consists of a porous, elastic solid framework (including the cytoskeleton, organelles, and macromolecules) immersed in an interstitial fluid called cytosol. The cytosol and the elastic solid framework, referred to as intracellular cytomatrix (CMX), are chemically isolated from each other and from the nucleus. The study found that CMX compartmentalizes the transcriptome, proteome, and metabolome, and that CMX-associated ribosomes exhibit a distinct mRNA profile compared to the cytosol. This compartmentalization enhances biocatalysis by sequestering metabolome enzymes, thereby overcoming spatial barriers to biochemical reactions. The analysis identified distinct responses in the cytosol and CMX during drug-induced protein deficiency, highlighting the flexibility of protein translation in the cytomatrix.

=== As a glass ===
It has been proposed that the cytoplasm behaves like a glass-forming liquid approaching the glass transition. In this theory, the greater the concentration of cytoplasmic components, the less the cytoplasm behaves like a liquid and the more it behaves as a solid glass, freezing more significant cytoplasmic components in place (it is thought that the cell's metabolic activity can fluidize the cytoplasm to allow the movement of such more significant cytoplasmic components). A cell's ability to vitrify in the absence of metabolic activity, as in dormant periods, may be beneficial as a defense strategy. A solid glass cytoplasm would freeze subcellular structures in place, preventing damage, while allowing the transmission of tiny proteins and metabolites, helping to kickstart growth upon the cell's revival from dormancy.

=== Other perspectives ===
Research has examined the motion of cytoplasmic particles independent of the nature of the cytoplasm. In such an alternative approach, the aggregate random forces within the cell caused by motor proteins explain the non-Brownian motion of cytoplasmic constituents.

== Constituents ==
The three major elements of the cytoplasm are the cytosol, organelles and inclusions.

=== Cytosol ===
The cytosol is the portion of the cytoplasm not contained within membrane-bound organelles. Cytosol makes up about 70% of the cell volume and is a complex mixture of cytoskeleton filaments, dissolved molecules, and water. The cytosol's filaments include the protein filaments such as actin filaments and microtubules that make up the cytoskeleton, as well as soluble proteins and small structures such as ribosomes, proteasomes, and the mysterious vault complexes. The inner, granular and more fluid portion of the cytoplasm is referred to as endoplasm.

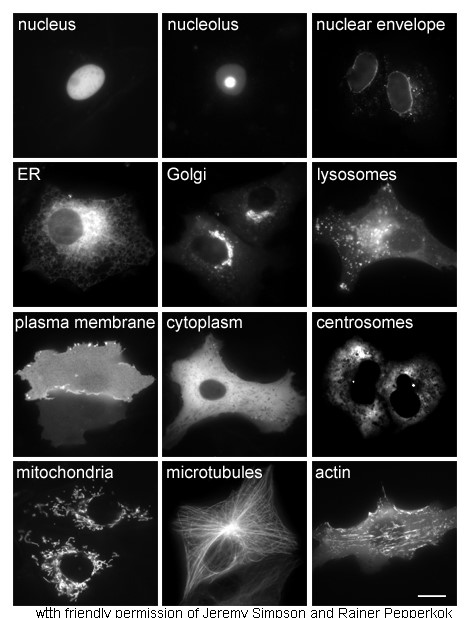
Proteins in different cellular compartments and structures tagged with green fluorescent protein

Due to this network of fibres and high concentrations of dissolved macromolecules, such as proteins, an effect called macromolecular crowding occurs and the cytosol does not act as an ideal solution. This crowding effect alters how the components of the cytosol interact with each other.

=== Organelles ===
Organelles include a number of individualized, but extremely complex structures found inside cells. These structures are responsible for executing virtually all cellular functions. Organelles were originally believed to be simple, tiny analogs of the macro-organs found in the bodies of humans and animals. However, the concept of a broad macro-micro association as it applies to the internal structure and function of cells would eventually be refuted. The first major challenge to scientific consensus related to the idea of macro-micro association is often cited as Félix Dujardin's 1834 C.E. refutation of naturalist Christian Gottfried Ehrenberg's popular position that microscopic life must consist of "complete organisms". Dujardin challenged the credibility of this (now discredited) model, since it tends toward the logical assumption that intra-cellular artifacts and their organization should form a derivative pathway linking the microscopic cellular structures with the macroscopic internal mechanisms and organization observed in higher animals. This idea has since been thoroughly refuted, (I.E: A snail l is NOT composed of many tiny snails). The persistence of this idea is reflected in the ultimately accepted naming convention "Organelles". The first use of the term is credited to German Zoologist Karl Möbius in 1884, based on the diminutive declension of the root "Organ".

Intra-cellular architecture as a field of study began as scientists first discovered the presence of such structures, eventually moved on to their basic cataloging by size and appearance, and eventually moving towards a more comprehensive identification and understanding of individual structure and function. This process began in the early 19th century with the advent of high-quality machine-standardized lenses for microscopes and continues today with the help of DNA sequencing.

Some examples of major organelles include the mitochondria, the endoplasmic reticulum, the Golgi apparatus, vacuoles, lysosomes, and in plant cells, chloroplasts.

=== Cytoplasmic inclusions ===
The inclusions are small particles of insoluble substances suspended in the cytosol. A huge range of inclusions exist in different cell types, and range from crystals of calcium oxalate or silicon dioxide in plants, to granules of energy-storage materials such as starch, glycogen, or polyhydroxybutyrate. A particularly widespread example are lipid droplets, which are spherical droplets composed of lipids and proteins that are used in both prokaryotes and eukaryotes as a way of storing lipids such as fatty acids and sterols. Lipid droplets make up much of the volume of adipocytes, which are specialized lipid-storage cells, but they are also found in a range of other cell types.

=== Controversy and research ===
The cytoplasm, mitochondria, and most organelles are contributions to the cell from the maternal gamete. Contrary to the older information that disregards any notion of the cytoplasm being active, new research has shown it to be in control of movement and flow of nutrients in and out of the cell by viscoplastic behavior and a measure of the reciprocal rate of bond breakage within the cytoplasmic network.

The material properties of the cytoplasm remain an ongoing investigation. A method of determining the mechanical behaviour of living cell mammalian cytoplasm with the aid of optical tweezers has been described.

== See also ==
- Amoeboid movement – Mode of locomotion in eukaryotic cells
- Cytoplasmic streaming – Flow of the cytoplasm inside the cell
- Protoplasm – Alternative term for cytoplasm or cytoplasm and nucleoplasm
- Syncytium – Type of multinucleate cell
