= Stéphane Leduc =

French biologist (1853–1939)

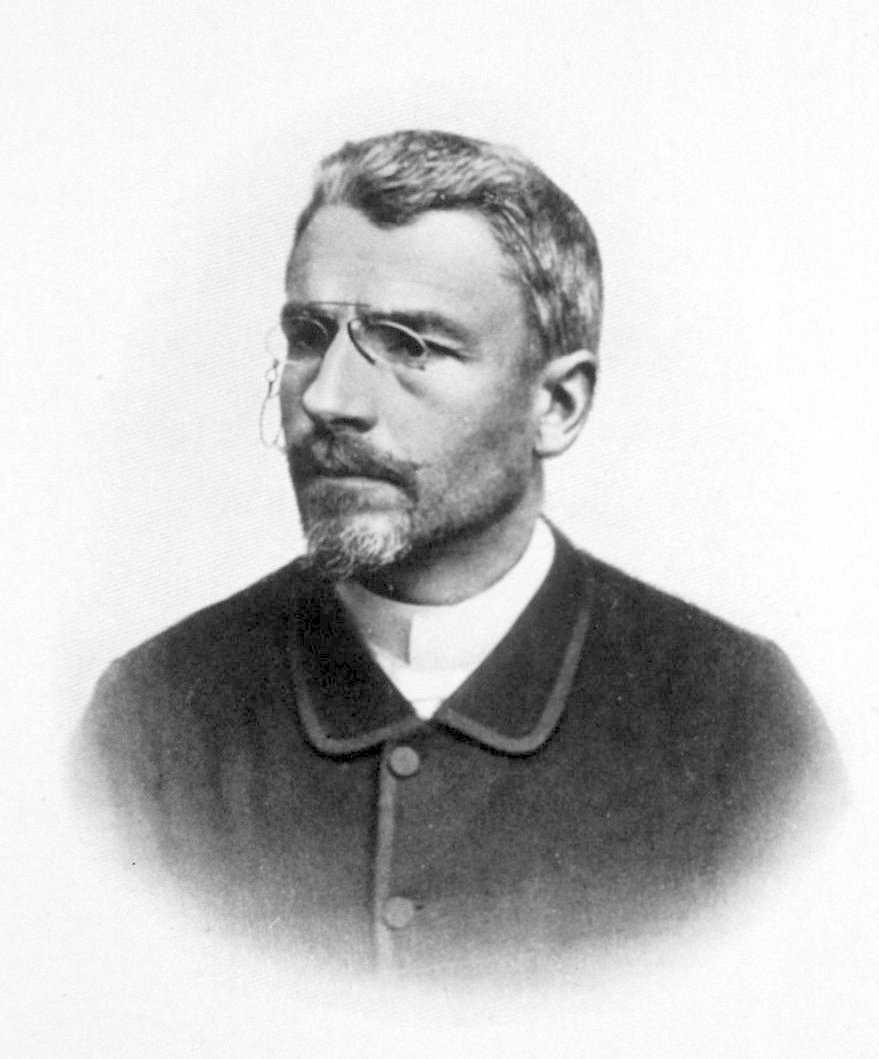
Stéphane Leduc

Stéphane Leduc (1 November 1853 – 8 March 1939) was a French biologist who sought to contribute to understanding of the chemical and physical mechanisms of life. He was a scientist in the fledgling field of synthetic biology, particularly in relation to diffusion and osmosis. He was a professor at the École de Médecine de Nantes and worked on osmotic crystallisation and the physiological effects of electric current. He was an Officier de la Légion d'honneur.

== Views ==
Leduc believed that it is necessary to appreciate biological processes from a physical perspective and constructed models from physics and chemistry to try to explain development and growth; these would typically involve ingenious combinations of chemicals to produce systems which mimicked the appearance of living processes such as karyokinesis and "remarkable fungus-like forms". He "[repudiated] extra-physical forces in the phenomena of life". According to Keller, these models were largely unsuccessful, "not just because of the conspicuous artificiality of his osmotic growths". Leduc sought to synthesise life "by directing the physical forces which are its cause" (in his own words).

== See also ==
- Chemical garden

== Publications ==
- Leduc, Stéphane (1906). Les bases physiques de la vie et la biogenèse. Paris: Masson.
- Leduc, Stéphane (1912). Poinat, A. (ed.). La biologie synthétique, étude de biophysique.
