= D domain =

Protein domain

D-domain (Dimerization domain) is found in the upstream of the F-box domain, which is a conserved dimerization motif located in WD40 repeat F box proteins, such as Cdc4, Met30, β-TrCP and Pop1/2. But Vts1, a RNA binding protein at the SAM domain found in yeast contain D-domain though it does not have any F-box domain.

As targeting domain or docking site, D-domain is found in the ETS-domain transcription factor Elk-1. It is distinct from the phospho-acceptor motifs and plays a crucial function in the efficient phosphorylation and activation of Elk-1 by MAP kinases (MAPKs) such as extracellular signal-regulated protein kinase (ERK), JNK, mitogen and stress-activated protein kinase-1, and ribosomal S6 kinase.

Additionally this domain can be incorporated into chimeric antigen receptor (CAR) designs for T cell therapies that allows for the specific recognition and binding of target antigens, such as CD123, which is a potential therapeutic target for hematologic malignancies like acute myelogenous leukemia (AML).

== Core components ==
D-domain is formed up of three alpha helices which generate a parallel dimer by self-associating in a right-handed super-helical way. There are two possible configurations for this domain's N terminus; those are an unstructured loop and an amphipathic alpha-helix (H0). Interactions with the adjacent thyroid hormone receptor ligand-binding domain's (TR-LBD), AF-2 coactivator-binding groove are necessary for the creation of the H0 structure of D-domain. While additional C-terminal residues are crucial only for JNKs, residues in the N-terminal end of the D-domain are significant for not only JNK MAPKs but also ERK.

The unique topology of D-domain enables it to target epitopes that may not be accessible to scFv CDR loops, offering the potential for improved antigen recognition.

== Function ==
D-domain can interconnect with another D-domain which belongs to indistinguishable protein. This type of interactions is called homotypic interactions. For instance, this kind of domain is important for the interaction of a subclass of F-box proteins which is named after WD40. This arranges in the π-system configuration that is known as suprafacial configuration which is observed between E2-site of every SCF protomer and the substrate-binding site. D-domain is also involved in the self-efficient binding of Fbw7 and stable dimerization of cyclin E T380 phospho-degron to Fbw7. Dimerization of β-TrCP1 and β-TrCP2 also found in NH_{2}-terminal of D-domain. This domain in the thyroid hormone receptor (TR) connects the DNA-binding domain (DBD) with the ligand-binding domain (LBD). It can form functionally useful extensions of the DBD and LBD. It also can unfold for the purpose of allowing TRs to adjust to various DNA response components and have the ability to substantially control rotational flexibility and TR DNA binding activity. This domain also serves as a JNK-binding motif, with variations in the respective kinase binding capacity observed between the c-Jun D-domain and the Elk-1 D-domain. The cytoplasmic region of the receptor for modern glycation end-products (RAGE) contains a sequence similar to the D-domain, which is important for the direct interaction between ERK and RAGE. This interaction is independent of the phosphorylation status of ERK and is conserved across species. Targeting via this increases the specificity and efficiency of the MAP kinase signal transduction pathway.

D-domain CARs have demonstrated potent antitumor activity in xenograft models, leading to complete durable remission in AML models. It can also be used to generate functional, bi-specific CARs by combining them with other specific targeting domains, such as a CD19-specific scFv.

== Regulation ==
Mutations in the D-domain can selectively inhibit TR interactions with specific DNA response elements and affect TR activity. In addition, it can be engineered to be less immunogenic by removing putative T cell epitopes, potentially reducing the risk of antigen-independent exhaustion. On the other hand, trivial effect on phosphorylation is observed due to mutation at the D-domain of p38MAPKs, which signifies the inertness of this domain to the interaction of Elk-1 to p38 MAPKs. Also, dimerization of the SCF complex facilitated by the D-domain shows insignificant overtly impact on catalytic competence or substrate affinity but enhances lysine acceptor site utilization.
