= Fuzzy complex =

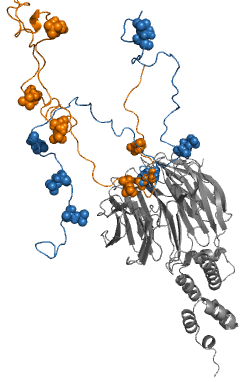
NMR structure of the cyclin-dependent kinase inhibitor Sic1 with the ubiquitin ligase Cdc4 (grey). Out of the nine phosphorylation sites of Sic 1 (spheres) the contacts with T45 and S76 are shown (orange and blue).

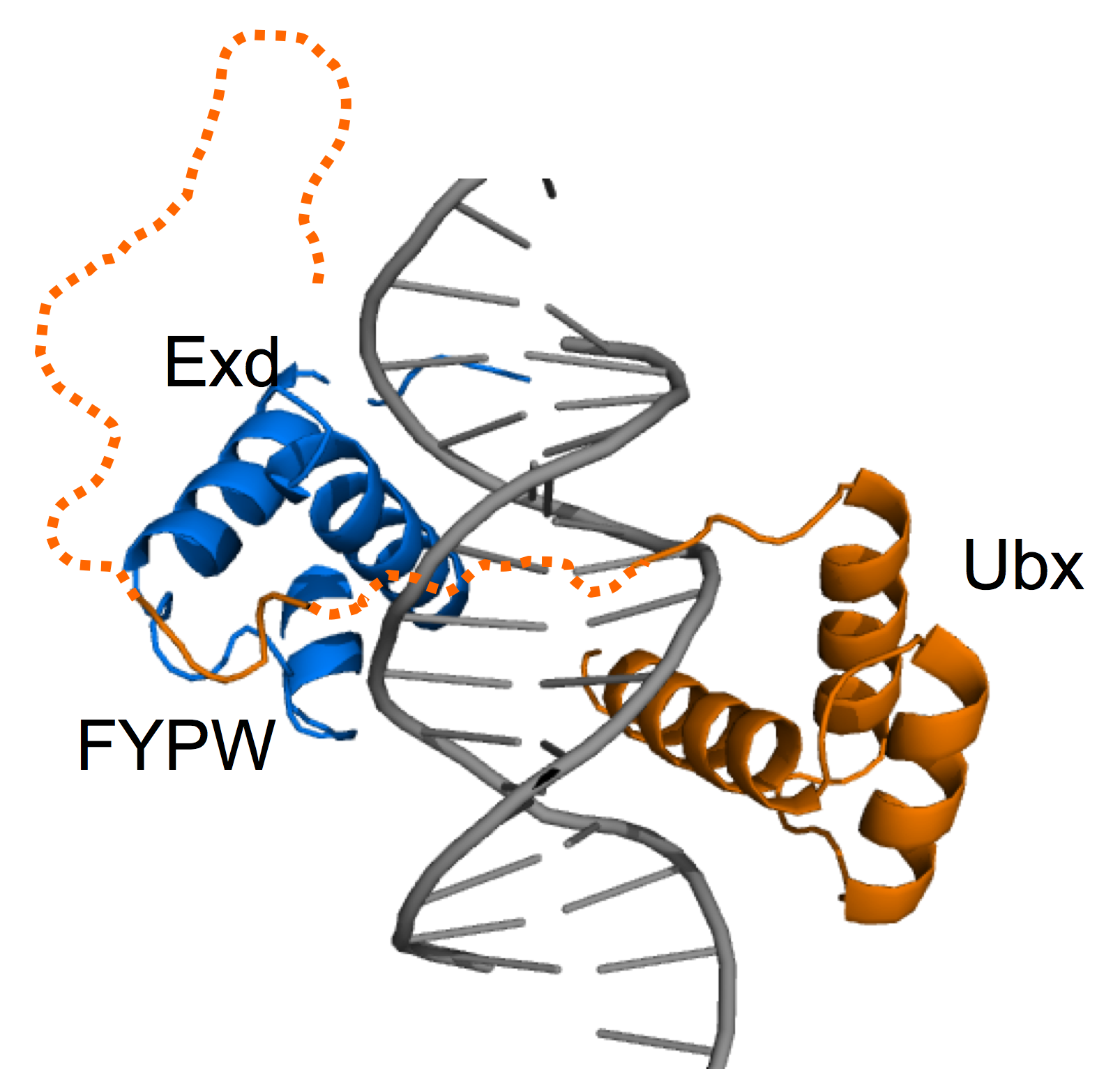
The fuzzy linker region (shown by dotted line) of the Ultrabithorax transcription factor (orange) connects the homeodomain with the Extradenticle homeodomain (blue) (PDB code 1bi). Alternative splicing modulates the length of the fuzzy region and thus its DNA (grey) binding affinity. Other regulatory fuzzy regions of Ultrabithorax are also shown by dotted lines.

Fuzzy complexes are protein complexes, where structural ambiguity or multiplicity exists and is required for biological function. Alteration, truncation or removal of conformationally ambiguous regions impacts the activity of the corresponding complex. Fuzzy complexes are generally formed by intrinsically disordered proteins. Structural multiplicity usually underlies functional multiplicity of protein complexes following a fuzzy logic. Distinct binding modes of the nucleosome are also regarded as a special case of fuzziness.

== Historical background ==
For almost 50 years molecular biology was based on two dogmas: (i) equating biological function of the protein with a unique three-dimensional structure and (ii) assuming exquisite specificity in protein complexes. Specificity/selectivity is ensured by unambiguous set of interactions formed between the protein and its ligand (another protein, DNA, RNA or small molecule). Many protein complexes however, contain functionally important/critical regions, which remain highly dynamic in the complex or adopt different conformations. This phenomenon is defined fuzziness. The most pertinent example is the cyclin-dependent kinase inhibitor Sic1, which binds to the SCF subunit of Cdc4 in a phosphorylation dependent manner. No regular secondary structures are gained upon phosphorylation and the different phosphorylation sites interchange in the complex.

== Classification of fuzzy complexes ==
Structural ambiguity in protein complexes covers a wide spectrum. In a polymorphic complex, the protein adopts two or more different conformations upon binding to the same partner, and these conformations can be resolved. Clamp, flanking and random complexes are dynamic, where ambiguous conformations interchange with each other and cannot be resolved. Interactions in fuzzy complexes are usually mediated by short motifs. Flanking regions are tolerant to sequence changes as long as the amino acid composition is maintained, for example in case of linker histone C-terminal domains and H4 histone N-terminal domains.

== Regulatory pathways via fuzzy regions ==
Fuzzy regions modulate the conformational equilibrium or flexibility of the binding interface via transient interactions. Dynamic regions can also compete with binding sites or tether them to the target. Modifications of fuzzy regions by further interactions, or posttranslational modifications impact binding affinity or specificity. Alternative splicing can modulate the length of fuzzy regions resulting in context-dependent binding (e.g. tissue-specificity) on the complex. EGF/MAPK, TGF-β and WNT/Wingless signaling pathways employ tissue-specific fuzzy regions.
