= CDC4 =

CDC4 may refer to:

- Cell division control protein 4
- Saint-Quentin Aerodrome
