= Dark proteome =

Category of proteins

The dark proteome is defined as a group of proteins with no defined three-dimensional structure. It can not be detected or analyzed with the use of homologous modeling or analytical quantification because the molecular conformation is unknown. Dark proteins are mostly composed of unknown unknowns.

== History ==
Dark proteins are estimated to be about 14% of the proteome in archaea and bacteria, while as much as 44–54% of the proteome in eukaryotes and viruses, is dark. Their origin is unclear. A large portion of the dark proteins are of viral origin. Dark protein regions are dark due to originating from unusual organisms without sufficient close relatives in protein databases to provide protein to protein data on sequence alignments and structure determination.

== Function ==
Dark proteins are not applicable to the structure-function paradigm that proteins follow. They predominately consist of Intrinsically Disordered Proteins (IDP) that are necessary for certain biological functions such as splicing, transcriptional, and post-translational signaling, and signaling via protein networks. These processes are commonly executed intracellularly. Dark proteins are also over-represented in the extra-cellular matrix and on the endoplasmic reticulum. Dark proteins behave similarly to polymers and are capable of taking on many conformations due to the adaptability of the polypeptide chain. This is due to the lack of structure, which provides flexibility and maneuverability that in turn aids in certain ribosomal and cellular processes. They also are overrepresented in certain secretory tissues and exterior environments which aid the cell against harsh cellular environments. The function is not limited to signaling and defense. "Dark proteins are mostly unknown unknowns."

== Methods for detection ==
Currently only computational and analytical techniques such as infrared (IR), circular dichroism (CR), mass spectrometry (MS), single-molecule experiment, wide-angle X-ray scattering, small-angle X-ray scattering, wide-angle X-ray scattering (WAXS), Nuclear magnetic resonance (NMR), and gel filtration are appropriate. Methodology coupled with techniques are recommended if data points remain missing with the use of one method.

== See also ==
- Intrinsically disordered proteins
- Protein dynamics
