= PCRPi-DB =

DataBase

Content
- Description: computationally annotated hot spots in protein interfaces.

Contact
- Research center: St James's University Hospital, University of Leeds
- Laboratory: Section of Experimental Therapeutics, Leeds Institute of Molecular Medicine
- Authors: Joan Segura
- Primary citation: Segura & al. (2011)
- Release date: 2010

Access
- Website: http://www.bioinsilico.org/PCRPIDB

Presaging Critical Residues in Protein Interfaces Database (PCRPi-DB) is a database of annotated hot spots in protein complexes for which the 3D structure is known.

== See also ==
- Protein structure
