= Protein complex =

Type of stable macromolecular complex

A protein complex or multiprotein complex is a group of two or more associated polypeptide chains. Protein complexes are distinct from multidomain enzymes, in which multiple catalytic domains are found in a single polypeptide chain.

Protein complexes are a form of quaternary structure. Proteins in a protein complex are linked by non-covalent protein–protein interactions. These complexes are a cornerstone of many (if not most) biological processes. The cell is seen to be composed of modular supramolecular complexes, each of which performs an independent, discrete biological function.

Through proximity, the speed and selectivity of binding interactions between enzymatic complex and substrates can be vastly improved, leading to higher cellular efficiency. Many of the techniques used to enter cells and isolate proteins are inherently disruptive to such large complexes, complicating the task of determining the components of a complex.

Examples of protein complexes include the proteasome for molecular degradation, the nuclear pore complex for regulating traffic into the nucleus, and most RNA polymerases. In stable complexes, large hydrophobic interfaces between proteins typically bury surface areas larger than 2500 square Ås.

== Function ==
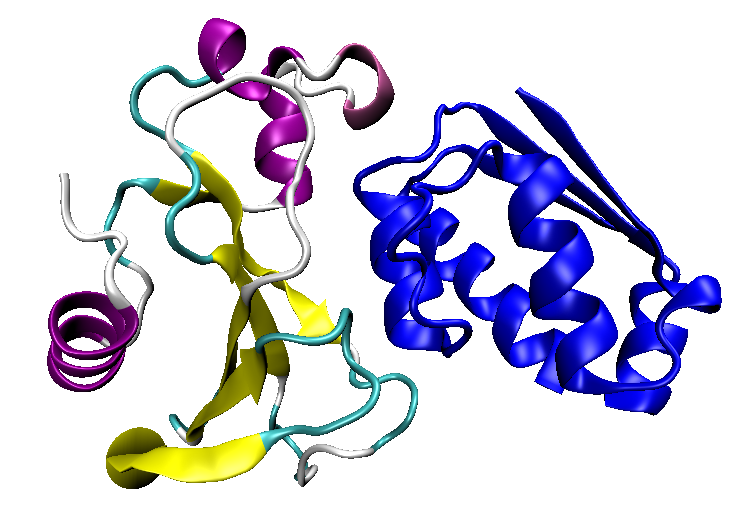
The Bacillus amyloliquefaciens ribonuclease barnase (colored) and its inhibitor (blue) in a complex

Protein complex formation can activate or inhibit one or more of the complex members and in this way, protein complex formation can be similar to phosphorylation. Individual proteins can participate in a variety of protein complexes. Of note, different permutations of the same complex are also possible with different Protein isoforms. For instance, the eIF4F complex has several different permutations with varying activity and targets. Different complexes perform different functions, and the same complex can perform multiple functions depending on various factors. include:

- Cell compartment location
- Cell cycle stage
- Cell nutritional status

Many protein complexes are well understood, particularly in the model organism Saccharomyces cerevisiae (yeast). For this relatively simple organism, the study of protein complexes is now genome wide and the elucidation of most of its protein complexes is ongoing. In 2021, researchers used deep learning software RoseTTAFold along with AlphaFold to predict the structures of 712 eukaryote complexes. They compared 6000 yeast proteins to those from 2026 other fungi and 4325 other eukaryotes.

== Types of protein complexes ==
=== Obligate vs non-obligate protein complex ===
If a protein can form a stable well-folded structure on its own (without any other associated protein) in vivo, then the complexes formed by such proteins are termed "non-obligate protein complexes". However, some proteins can't be found to create a stable well-folded structure alone, but can be found as a part of a protein complex which stabilizes the constituent proteins. Such protein complexes are called "obligate protein complexes".

=== Transient vs permanent/stable protein complex ===
Transient protein complexes form and break down transiently in vivo, whereas permanent complexes have a relatively long half-life. Typically, the obligate interactions (protein–protein interactions in an obligate complex) are permanent, whereas non-obligate interactions have been found to be either permanent or transient. Note that there is no clear distinction between obligate and non-obligate interaction, rather there exist a continuum between them which depends on various conditions e.g. pH, protein concentration etc. However, there are important distinctions between the properties of transient and permanent/stable interactions: stable interactions are highly conserved but transient interactions are far less conserved, interacting proteins on the two sides of a stable interaction have more tendency of being co-expressed than those of a transient interaction (in fact, co-expression probability between two transiently interacting proteins is not higher than two random proteins), and transient interactions are much less co-localized than stable interactions. Though, transient by nature, transient interactions are very important for cell biology: the human interactome is enriched in such interactions, these interactions are the dominating players of gene regulation and signal transduction, and proteins with intrinsically disordered regions (IDR: regions in protein that show dynamic inter-converting structures in the native state) are found to be enriched in transient regulatory and signaling interactions.

=== Fuzzy complex ===
Fuzzy protein complexes have more than one structural form or dynamic structural disorder in the bound state. This means that proteins may not fold completely in either transient or permanent complexes. Consequently, specific complexes can have ambiguous interactions, which vary according to the environmental signals. Hence different ensembles of structures result in different (even opposite) biological functions. Post-translational modifications, protein interactions or alternative splicing modulate the conformational ensembles of fuzzy complexes, to fine-tune affinity or specificity of interactions. These mechanisms are often used for regulation within the eukaryotic transcription machinery.

== Essential proteins in protein complexes ==
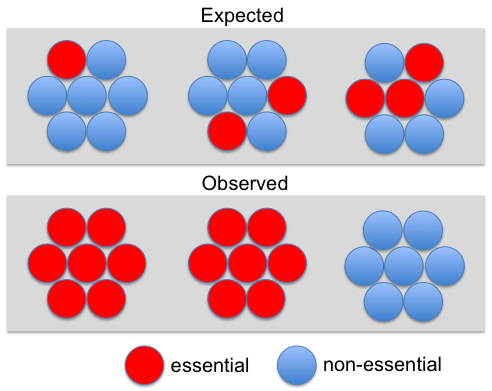
Essential proteins in yeast complexes occur much less randomly than expected by chance. Modified after Ryan et al. 2013

Although some early studies suggested a strong correlation between essentiality and protein interaction degree (the "centrality-lethality" rule) subsequent analyses have shown that this correlation is weak for binary or transient interactions (e.g., yeast two-hybrid). However, the correlation is robust for networks of stable co-complex interactions. In fact, a disproportionate number of essential genes belong to protein complexes. This led to the conclusion that essentiality is a property of molecular machines (i.e. complexes) rather than individual components. Wang et al. (2009) noted that larger protein complexes are more likely to be essential, explaining why essential genes are more likely to have high co-complex interaction degree. Ryan et al. (2013) referred to the observation that entire complexes appear essential as "modular essentiality". These authors also showed that complexes tend to be composed of either essential or non-essential proteins rather than showing a random distribution (see Figure). However, this not an all or nothing phenomenon: only about 26% (105/401) of yeast complexes consist of solely essential or solely nonessential subunits.

In humans, genes whose protein products belong to the same complex are more likely to result in the same disease phenotype.

== Homomultimeric and heteromultimeric proteins ==
The subunits of a multimeric protein may be identical as in a homomultimeric (homooligomeric) protein or different as in a heteromultimeric protein. Many soluble and membrane proteins form homomultimeric complexes in a cell, majority of proteins in the Protein Data Bank are homomultimeric. Homooligomers are responsible for the diversity and specificity of many pathways, may mediate and regulate gene expression, activity of enzymes, ion channels, receptors, and cell adhesion processes.

The voltage-gated potassium channels in the plasma membrane of a neuron are heteromultimeric proteins composed of four of forty known alpha subunits. Subunits must be of the same subfamily to form the multimeric protein channel. The tertiary structure of the channel allows ions to flow through the hydrophobic plasma membrane. Connexons are an example of a homomultimeric protein composed of six identical connexins. A cluster of connexons forms the gap-junction in two neurons that transmit signals through an electrical synapse.

=== Intragenic complementation ===
When multiple copies of a polypeptide encoded by a gene form a complex, this protein structure is referred to as a multimer. When a multimer is formed from polypeptides produced by two different mutant alleles of a particular gene, the mixed multimer may exhibit greater functional activity than the unmixed multimers formed by each of the mutants alone. In such a case, the phenomenon is referred to as intragenic complementation (also called inter-allelic complementation). Intragenic complementation has been demonstrated in many different genes in a variety of organisms including the fungi Neurospora crassa, Saccharomyces cerevisiae and Schizosaccharomyces pombe; the bacterium Salmonella typhimurium; the virus bacteriophage T4, an RNA virus and humans. In such studies, numerous mutations defective in the same gene were often isolated and mapped in a linear order on the basis of recombination frequencies to form a genetic map of the gene. Separately, the mutants were tested in pairwise combinations to measure complementation. An analysis of the results from such studies led to the conclusion that intragenic complementation, in general, arises from the interaction of differently defective polypeptide monomers to form a multimer. Genes that encode multimer-forming polypeptides appear to be common. One interpretation of the data is that polypeptide monomers are often aligned in the multimer in such a way that mutant polypeptides defective at nearby sites in the genetic map tend to form a mixed multimer that functions poorly, whereas mutant polypeptides defective at distant sites tend to form a mixed multimer that functions more effectively. The intermolecular forces likely responsible for self-recognition and multimer formation were discussed by Jehle.

== Structure determination ==
The molecular structure of protein complexes can be determined by experimental techniques such as X-ray crystallography, Single particle analysis or nuclear magnetic resonance. Increasingly the theoretical option of protein–protein docking is also becoming available. One method that is commonly used for identifying the complexes is immunoprecipitation. Recently, Raicu and coworkers developed a method to determine the quaternary structure of protein complexes in living cells. This method is based on the determination of pixel-level Förster resonance energy transfer (FRET) efficiency in conjunction with spectrally resolved two-photon microscope. The distribution of FRET efficiencies are simulated against different models to get the geometry and stoichiometry of the complexes.

== Assembly ==
Proper assembly of multiprotein complexes is important, since misassembly can lead to disastrous consequences. In order to study pathway assembly, researchers look at intermediate steps in the pathway. One such technique that allows one to do that is electrospray mass spectrometry, which can identify different intermediate states simultaneously. This has led to the discovery that most complexes follow an ordered assembly pathway. In the cases where disordered assembly is possible, the change from an ordered to a disordered state leads to a transition from function to dysfunction of the complex, since disordered assembly leads to aggregation.

The structure of proteins play a role in how the multiprotein complex assembles. The interfaces between proteins can be used to predict assembly pathways. The intrinsic flexibility of proteins also plays a role: more flexible proteins allow for a greater surface area available for interaction.

While assembly is a different process from disassembly, the two are reversible in both homomeric and heteromeric complexes. Thus, the overall process can be referred to as (dis)assembly.

=== Evolutionary significance of multiprotein complex assembly ===
In homomultimeric complexes, the homomeric proteins assemble in a way that mimics evolution. That is, an intermediate in the assembly process is present in the complex's evolutionary history. The opposite phenomenon is observed in heteromultimeric complexes, where gene fusion occurs in a manner that preserves the original assembly pathway.

== See also ==
- Heterotetramer
- Biomolecular complex
- Protein subunit
