= List of disorder prediction software =

Computational methods exploit the sequence signatures of disorder to predict whether a protein is disordered, given its amino acid sequence. The table below, which was originally adapted from and has been recently updated, shows the main features of software for disorder prediction. Note that different software use different definitions of disorder.

Predictor	Year Published	What is predicted	Based on	Generates and uses multiple sequence alignment?	Free for commercial use
DR-BERT	2024	Per-residue disorder predictor for a single-sequence input	A compact protein language model	No	Yes
PFVM	2023	Predict the protein intrinsic disorder regions, degree of disorder as well as folding patterns.	Based on five amino acids, the folding variations along sequence are presented by Protein Folding Shape Code (PFSC) in Protein Folding Variation Matrix (PFVM).	No	Yes, Login=public; Password=public; select "Prediction"
SPOT-Disorder2	2020	Per-residue probability of a sequence residue being disordered.	Ensemble of Bidirectional Long Short-Term Memory and Inception-Residual Squeeze-and-Excitation Convolutional Neural Networks	Yes	No
Disprot	2019				
NetSurfP-2.0	2019	Secondary structure and disorder prediction method	Long Short-Term Memory and Convolutional Neural Networks	Yes	No
SPOT-Disorder-Single	2018	Per-residue disorder predictor for a single-sequence input (i.e. no MSA profile).	An ensemble of Long Short-Term Memory Bidirectional Recurrent Neural Networks and residual convolutional networks.	No	No
IUPred	2005-2018	Regions that lack a well-defined 3D-structure under native conditions	Energy resulting from inter-residue interactions, estimated from local amino acid composition	No	No
MobiDB-lite	2017	Consensus-based prediction of residue disorder	Eight separate disorder predictors from various groups	No	No
SPOT-Disorder	2017	Outputs the probability of each residue in a protein sequence of being disordered or ordered.	A deep recurrent neural network architecture using Long Short-Term Memory (LSTM) cells.	Yes	No
Disopred2	2004-2015	Regions devoid of ordered regular secondary structure	Cascaded support vector machine classifiers trained on PSI-BLAST profiles	Yes	No
s2D	2015	Predict secondary structure and intrinsic disorder in one unified statistical framework based on the analysis of NMR chemical shifts	Neural networks trained on NMR solution-based data.	Yes	No
DisPredict_v1.0	2015	Assigns binary order/disorder class and corresponding confidence score for each protein residues using optimized SVM with Radial basis kernel from protein sequence	AA composition, Physical Properties, Helix, strand and coil probability, Accessible surface area, torsion angle fluctuation, monogram, bigram.	No	?
SLIDER	2014	A binary prediction of whether a protein has a long disordered region (>30 residues)	Physicochemical properties of amino acids, sequence complexity, and amino acid composition	No	?
MFDp2	2013	Helix, strand and coil probability, relative entropy and per residue disorder prediction.	A combination of MFDp and DisCon predictors with unique post processing. Improved prediction over MFDp.	Yes	No
ESpritz	2012	Disorder definitions include: missing x-ray atoms (short), Disprot style disorder (long), and NMR flexibility. A probability of disorder is supplied with two decision thresholds which depend on a user preferred false positive rate.	Bi-directional neural networks with diverse and high quality data derived from the Protein Data Bank and DisProt. Compares extremely well with other CASP 9 servers. The method was designed to be very fast.	No	No
GeneSilico Metadisorder	2012	Regions that lack a well-defined 3D structure under native conditions (REMARK-465)	Meta method, which uses other disorder predictors (like RONN, IUPred, POODLE, and many more). Based on them the consensus is calculated according method accuracy (optimized using ANN, filtering and other techniques). Currently the best available method (first 2 places in last CASP experiment (blind test))	Yes	No
SPINE-D	2012	Output long/short disorder and semi-disorder (0.4-0.7) and full disorder (0.7-1.0). Semi-disorder is semi-collapsed with some secondary structure.	A neural network based three-state predictor based on both local and global features. Ranked in Top 5 based on AUC in CASP 9.	Yes	No
CSpritz	2011	Disorder definitions include: missing x-ray atoms (short) and DisProt style disorder (long). A probability of disorder is supplied with two decision thresholds which depend on the false positive rate. Linear motifs within a disorder segment are determined by simple pattern matching from ELM.	Support Vector Machine and Bi-directional neural networks with high quality and diverse data derived from the Protein Data Bank and Disprot. Structural information is also supplied in the form of homologous templates. Compares extremely well with other CASP 9 servers.	Yes	No
PONDR	1999-2010	All regions that are not rigid including random coils, partially unstructured regions, and molten globules	Local aa composition, flexibility, hydropathy, etc.	No	No
MFDp	2010	Different types of disorder including random coils, unstructured regions, molten globules, and REMARK-465-based regions.	An ensemble of 3 SVMs specialized for the prediction of short, long and generic disordered regions, which combines three complementary disorder predictors, sequence, sequence profiles, predicted secondary structure, solvent accessibility, backbone dihedral torsion angles, residue flexibility and B-factors. MFDp (unofficially) secured 3rd place in last CASP experiment)	Yes	No
FoldIndex	2005	Regions that have a low hydrophobicity and high net charge (either loops or unstructured regions)	Charge/hydrophaty analyzed locally using a sliding window	No	?
RONN	2005	Regions that lack a well-defined 3D structure under native conditions	Bio-basis function neural network trained on disordered proteins	No	No
GlobPlot	2003	Regions with high propensity for globularity on the Russell/Linding scale (propensities for secondary structures and random coils)	Russell/Linding scale of disorder	No	Yes
DisEMBL	2003	LOOPS (regions devoid of regular secondary structure); HOT LOOPS (highly mobile loops); REMARK465 (regions lacking electron density in crystal structure)	Neural networks trained on X-ray structure data	No	Yes
SEG	1994	Low-complexity segments that is, "simple sequences" or "compositionally biased regions".	Locally optimized low-complexity segments are produced at defined levels of stringency and then refined according to the equations of Wootton and Federhen	No	?

Methods not available anymore:

Predictor	What is predicted	Based on	Generates and uses multiple sequence alignment?
OnD-CRF	The transition between structurally ordered and mobile or disordered amino acids intervals under native conditions.	OnD-CRF applies Conditional Random Fields, CRFs, which rely on features generated from the amino acid sequence and from secondary structure prediction.	No
NORSp	Regions with No Ordered Regular Secondary Structure (NORS). Most, but not all, are highly flexible.	Secondary structure and solvent accessibility	Yes
HCA (Hydrophobic Cluster Analysis)	Hydrophobic clusters, which tend to form secondary structure elements	Helical visualization of amino acid sequence	No
PreLink	Regions that are expected to be unstructured in all conditions, regardless of the presence of a binding partner	Compositional bias and low hydrophobic cluster content.	No
MD (Meta-Disorder predictor)	Regions of different "types"; for example, unstructured loops and regions containing few stable intra-chain contacts	A neural-network based meta-predictor that uses different sources of information predominantly obtained from orthogonal approaches	Yes
IUPforest-L	Long disordered regions in a set of proteins	Moreau-Broto auto-correlation function of amino acid indices (AAIs)	No
MeDor (Metaserver of Disorder)	Regions of different "types". MeDor provides a unified view of multiple disorder predictors.	Meta method, which uses other disorder predictors (like FoldIndex, DisEMBL REMARK465, IUPred, RONN ...) and provides additional features (like HCA plot, Secondary Structure prediction, Transmembrane domains ... ) that all together help the user in defining regions involved in disorder.	No
