= CRD-BP =

The mouse Coding Region Determinant-Binding Protein (CRD-BP) is an RNA-binding protein. CRD-BP belongs to a family of RNA binding proteins that show close a relation to the chicken β-actin zipcode-binding protein ZBP1 and the human forms of the protein IMP-1, IMP-2 and IMP-3. Because of their close relationship, CRD-BP and its orthologs are thought to share the same biochemical properties. Upon binding to its transcripts, CRD-BP plays a role in translation by stabilizing and localizing the transcripts in the cell. Normal expression of CRD-BP has been seen in the early development of the embryo. Conversely, CRD-BP expression in adult tissue is extremely low or completely absent.

== Structure ==
CRD-BP is a 577 amino acid protein that contains 4 KH domains, 2 RRMs and a RGG box (Figure 2). CRD-BP and human IMP-1 are not identical but shows a high degree of resemblance. They are very closely related to IMP-2, which has been determined through phylogenetic analysis (Figure 1). As a result of this close phylogeny, the structure of the conserved functional domains is shared between CRD-BP, ZBP1 and the human IMPs (Figure 2). The conserved KH domains are shared throughout the orthologs and they are able to form dimers which orient the RNA binding regions in a polar opposite manner (Figure 3A). This orientation creates room for each G-X-X-G motif (Figure 3B) of each KH domain to bind its RNA transcript (Figure 3A).

== CRD-BP RNA transcripts ==
CRD-BP and its orthologs have been shown to have the ability to bind CD44, beta-actin, c-myc, IGF2, H19 and tau RNA transcripts. CRD-BP has been shown to play a crucial role in cancer growth and invasion of tissues. CD44 proteins belong to a family of cell surface adhesion molecules that are involved in both cell-cell and cell-matrix communications. CRD-BP binds to and protects CD44 RNA which shows increased expression in cancers. CRD-BP plays a role in the localization of β-actin mRNA by binding to the localization element in the 3'UTR region. Aberrant expression of the oncogenic c-myc gene has been shown in the formation of tumours. c-myc mRNA contains a coding region instability determinant (CRD) which CRD-BP has been shown to bind, therefore, protecting c-myc mRNA from endonucleolytic attack. CRD-BP also binds IGF2 and H19 mRNA. The H19 gene is located downstream of the IGF2 on chromosome 11 and chromosome 7 on humans and mice, respectively. The binding of CRD-BP to these transcripts has shown to alter the expression of the genes. The microtubule-associated protein (MAP) is coded for by tau mRNA and is mainly found in the axon of neurons. The 3’UTR of tau mRNA contains a cis-regulatory element that controls the axonal localization of tau mRNA. CRD-BP binds to the axonal localization signal (ALS) of tau and plays a role in the localization of the transcript.

CRD-BP, therefore, has been shown to be upregulated in many diseases, including cancers.
