= Vts1 =

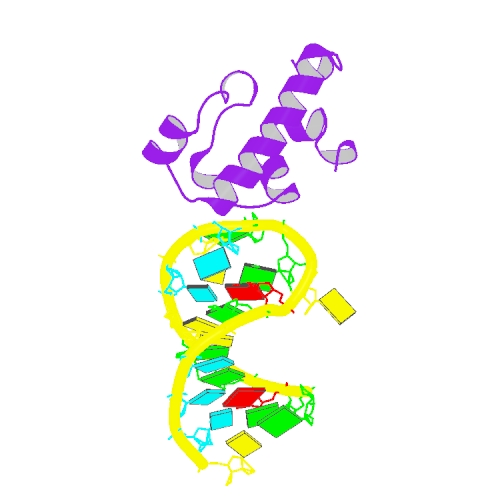
- Crystal structure of Vts1p–SRE complex.

Identifiers
- Symbol: Vts1
- Pfam: PF07647
- SCOP2: 1b0x / SCOPe / SUPFAM
Available protein structures:
- PDB: PF07647 (ECOD; PDBsum)
- AlphaFold: PF07647

Vts1 is a post-transcriptional regulator that has RNA-binding Sterile alpha motif (SAM) domain. The protein is found in Saccharomyces cerevisiae and several eukaryotes. In Saccharomyces the Vts1 impacts vesicular transport and sporulation.

== Interactions ==
Secondary structure motif of RNA region interacting with Vts1

Protein-protein interactions through SAM domains participate in different regulatory activities such as signal transduction. Proteins having such domains were also shown to recognize and interact with RNA structures of similar shape to the Smaug response element (SRE). Vts1 binds to RNA targets that have CUGGC on hairpin loops.
