= Cell division control protein 4 =

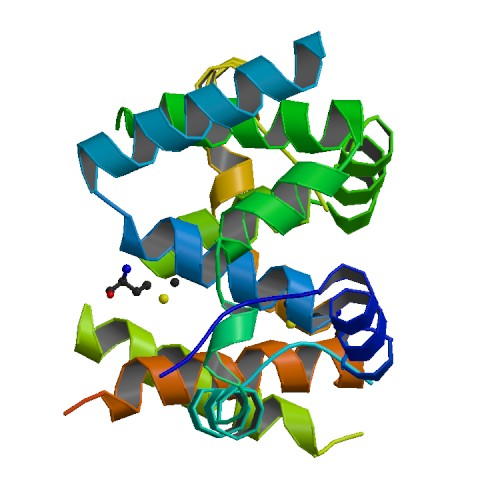
- Crystal structure of Cdc4

Identifiers
- Organism: Saccharomyces cerevisiae (Baker's yeast)
- Symbol: CDC4
- Alt. symbols: YFL009W
- Entrez: 850539
- Orthologs: NCBI: entry; OMA: entry
- PDB: 1NEX, 2P63, 3MKS, 3V7D
- RefSeq (mRNA): NM_001179957
- RefSeq (Prot): NP_116585
- UniProt: P07834

Other data
- Chromosome: VI: 0.12 - 0.12 Mb
Search for
- Structures: Swiss-model
- Domains: InterPro

Cell division control protein 4 (Cdc4) is a protein found in yeast that acts as a substrate recognition component of the SCF (SKP1-CUL1-F-box protein) ubiquitin ligase complex, which acts as a mediator of ubiquitin transfer to target proteins, leading to their subsequent degradation via the ubiquitin-proteasome pathway. The analogous protein in humans is FBXW7. Cdc4 targets primarily cell cycle regulators for proteolysis. It serves the function of an adaptor that brings target molecules to the core SCF complex.

Cdc4 was originally identified in the model organism Saccharomyces cerevisiae. CDC4 gene function is required at G1/S and G2/M transitions during mitosis and at various stages during meiosis.

== Homologues ==
The human homologue of the cdc4 gene is called FBXW7. The corresponding gene product is the F-box/WD repeat-containing protein 7.

F-box/WD repeat-containing protein 7

Identifiers
- Symbol: Fbw7
- Alt. symbols: F-box and WD-40 domain-containing protein 7, F-box protein FBX30, Archipelago homolog (hAgo), SEL-10, hCdc4
- UniProt: Q969H0
Search for
- Structures: Swiss-model
- Domains: InterPro

In the nematode C. elegans, the homologue to Cdc4 is F-box/WD repeat-containing protein sel-10.

F-box/WD repeat-containing protein sel-10

Identifiers
- Symbol: F-box/WD repeat-containing protein sel-10
- Alt. symbols: Suppressor/enhancer of lin-12 protein 10 Egg laying defective protein 41
- UniProt: Q93794
Search for
- Structures: Swiss-model
- Domains: InterPro

== Some general features ==
Cdc4 has a molecular weight of 86'089Da, an isoelectric point of 7.14, and consists of 779 amino acids. It resides exclusively in the nucleus because of a single monopartite nuclear localisation sequence (NLS) comprising amino acids 82-85 in the N-terminal domain.

== Structure ==
Cdc4 is one component of the E3 complex SCF (CDC4), which comprises CDC53, SKP1, RBX1, and CDC4. Its 779 amino acids (in S. cerevisiae) are arranged into one F-box domain (approximately 40 amino acids ("F-box" motif)) and 7 WD repeats.

Cdc4 is a WD-40 repeat F-box protein. Like all members of this family, it contains a conserved dimerization motif called D domain. In yeast Cdc4, the D domain protomers arrange in a superhelical homodimeric manner. SCF (Cdc4) dimerization hardly affects the affinity for target molecules, but significantly increases ubiquitin conjugation. Cdc4 adapts a suprafacial configuration: The substrate-binding sites lie in the same plane AS the catalytic sites, with a separation of 64Å within and 102Å between each SCF monomer. In Cdc4, the substrate binding domain is built on WD40 domains, which use repeats of 40 amino acids), each forming four anti-parallel beta-strands, to assemble the blades of a so-called beta-propeller. Beta-propellers are a quite frequent form of adaptable surface for interaction between different proteins. This substrate interaction region is located C-terminally. There are three isoforms of Cdc4 in mammals: α, β, and γ. These are produced via alternative splicing of 3 unique 5’ exons to 10 common 3’ exons. This results in proteins that differ only at their N-termini.

Cdc4 protein interacts with Cdc34, an ubiquitin-conjugating enzyme, and Cdc53 in vivo. (There is a Cdc4p/Cdc53p-binding region on Cdc34p.) All three proteins are stable throughout the cell cycle.

== Function ==
Fig. 1 The figure shows a sketch of how the SCF complex functions, and what the role of Cdc4 is within this structure (-> adaptor function).

Various cellular regulatory mechanisms heavily depend on ubiquitin-dependent degradation. The SCF (Cdc4) complex has a regulatory function in cell cycle progression, signal transduction, and transcription. In order for the cell cycle to proceed, several inhibitory proteins, as well as cyclins, have to be eliminated at given time points. Cdc4 assists there by recruiting target molecules via its C-terminal substrate interaction domain (WD40 repeat domain) to the ubiquitination machinery. This causes transfer of ubiquitin molecules to the target, hence marks it for degradation. Cdc4 recognizes and binds to phosphorylated target proteins.

Cdc4 can be essential, or nonessential, depending on the organism. For instance, it is essential in S. cerevisiae, while it is non-essential in C. albicans. It is essential for initiation of DNA replication and separation of spindle pole bodies, hence for the formation of the poles of the mitotic spindle. In budding yeast it is also involved in bud development, fusion of zygotic nuclei (karyogamy) after conjugation, and several aspects of sporulation. Roughly speaking, in the cell cycle Cdc4 function is required for G1/S and G2/M transition.

Some important interactions in which Cdc4 is involved are:

- ubiquitination of the phosphorylated form of the cell cycle kinase inhibitor (CKI) SIC1
- degradation of the CKI FAR1 in absence of pheromone; restriction of FAR1 degradation to the nucleus (since Cdc4 is exclusively nuclear)
- transcription activation of the HTA1-HTB1 locus
- degradation of the phosphorylated form of Cdc6

=== Onset of S-phase ===
Swi5 is a transcriptional activator of Sic1, which inhibits S-phase CDKs. Thus, Sic1 protein degradation is necessary to enter S-phase. SCF (Cdc4) complex’s regulatory function concerning S-phase entry comprises not only degradation of Sic1, but also degradation of Swi5. In order for the substrate adapter unit Cdc4 to bind to Sic1, a minimum of any six of the nine cyclin-dependent kinase sites on Sic1 have to be phosphorylated. In other words: There is a threshold number of phosphorylation sites in order to achieve receptor-ligand binding. As recently stated, this "suggests that the ultrasensitivity in the Sic1-Cdc4 system may be driven at least in part by cumulative electrostatic interactions". In general, an ultrasensitive enzyme requires less than 81-fold increase in stimulus to drive it from 10% to 90% activity. "Ultrasensitivity" highlights that the upstroke of the stimulus/response curve is steeper than the one that is obtained for a hyperbolic Michaelis-Menten enzyme. Thus, ultrasensitivity allows a highly sensitive response: A graded input can be transformed into a sharply thresholded output. The development of B-type cyclin–cyclin-dependent kinase activity, as well as the onset of DNA replication, requires degradation of Sic1 in the late G1 phase of the cell cycle. The WD domain of Cdc4 binds to the phosphorylated form of Sic1. Each bond to a Sic1-Phosphate is weak, but together the binding is strong enough to enable Sic1-degradation via the pathway described before. Hence, in this case ultrasensitivity allows precise definition ("fine tuning") of the time point in which destruction of Sic1 occurs, leading to initiation of the next step in the cell cycle (-> DNA replication).

=== G2/M transition ===
Up until now it is not satisfyingly understood how Cdc4 triggers G2-M transition. In general, the second degradation complex involved in cell cycle progression, APC, is responsible for proteolysis at that stage. However, experimental data suggests that Cdc4 function in G2/M transition may be linked to the degradation of Pds1 (anaphase inhibitor). And what is more, CDC4 and CDC20, an activator of APC, interact genetically.

Cdc4 recruits several other substrates than Sic1 to the SCF core complex, including the Cln-Cdc28 inhibitor / cytoskeletal scaffold protein Far1, the transcription factor Gcn4, and the replication protein Cdc6. In addition to those functions mentioned above, Cdc4 is involved in some other degradation-dependent events in S. cerevisiae like for instance unfolded protein response.

== Clinical significance ==
The mammalian ortholog of Cdc4, FBXW7, has substrates which include c-Myc, Src3, Cyclin E, and the Notch intracellular domain. Due to its involvement in degradation of various cell cycle regulators, as well as several compounds of signaling pathways (e.g. Notch), FBXW7 is a highly sensible component of every organism in which it functions. The FBXW7 gene is a haplo-insufficient tumor suppressor gene. Knock-out of this gene in mice leads to an embryonic lethal phenotype. FBXW7 mutations occur in a number of cancer types. They are described best in colorectal tumors, and also have been found to be a mutational target in pancreatic cancer.

E3 has an additional function to its primary role in the degradation of certain cell cycle regulators: It is also involved in formation of the neural crest. Hence, FBXW7 is a protein "with separable but complementary functions in control of cell proliferation and differentiation". This evokes the assumption -beyond regulating cell cycle progression- FBXW7 as a tumor suppressor protein may extend its ability to directly regulate tissue differentiation. However, its concrete role in diseases is still to be elucidated.

== See also ==
- ubiquitin ligase
- ubiquitin proteasome system
- cell cycle
