= FBXW7 =

Protein-coding gene in the species Homo sapiens

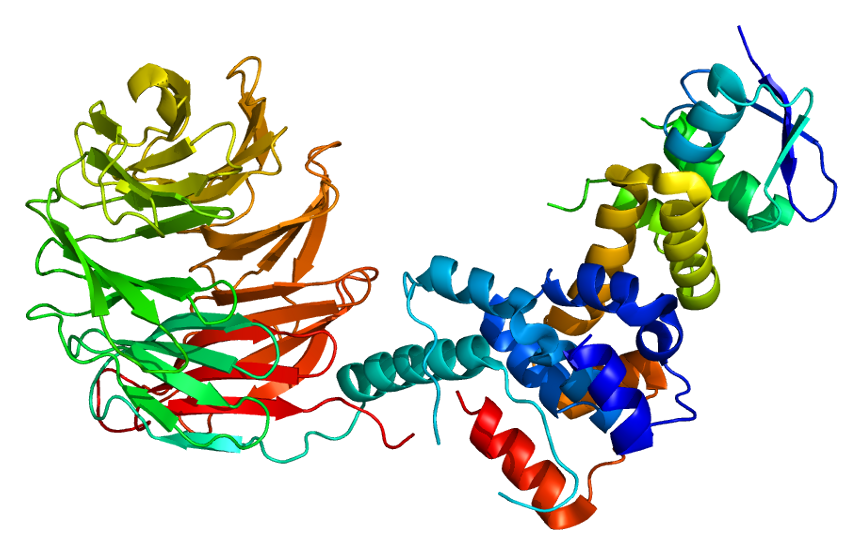

Identifiers
- Aliases: FBXW7, AGO, CDC4, FBW6, FBW7, FBX30, FBXO30, FBXW6, SEL-10, SEL10, hAgo, hCdc4, F-box and WD repeat domain containing 7
- External IDs: OMIM: 606278; MGI: 1354695; GeneCards: FBXW7
Available structures
PDB	Ortholog search: PDBe RCSB
PDB	List of PDB id codes 2OVP, 2OVQ, 2OVR, 5IBK

Gene location (Human)
Chr.	Chromosome 4 (human)
Band	4q31.3	Start	152,320,544 bp
Band	4q31.3	End	152,536,092 bp

Gene location (Mouse)
Chr.	Chromosome 3 (mouse)
Band	3 F1|3 37.7 cM	Start	84,722,575 bp
Band	3 F1|3 37.7 cM	End	84,886,505 bp
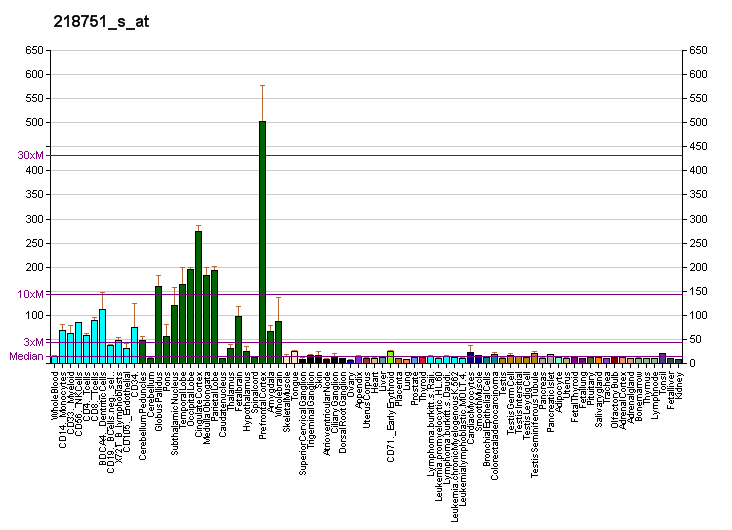
RNA expression pattern
Bgee	Human / Mouse (ortholog); Top expressed in: Brodmann area 23; Achilles tendon; epithelium of colon; middle temporal gyrus; superior frontal gyrus; occipital lobe; pons; parietal lobe; primary visual cortex; postcentral gyrus / Top expressed in: prefrontal cortex; primary motor cortex; barrel cortex; visual cortex; temporal lobe; primary visual cortex; amygdala; saccule; superior frontal gyrus; Region I of hippocampus proper; More reference expression data
BioGPS	More reference expression data
Gene ontology
Molecular function	protein-macromolecule adaptor activity; protein binding; ubiquitin-protein transferase activator activity; identical protein binding; ubiquitin protein ligase binding; cyclin binding; phosphothreonine residue binding; ubiquitin-protein transferase activity; ubiquitin binding
Cellular component	cytoplasm; Parkin-FBXW7-Cul1 ubiquitin ligase complex; SCF ubiquitin ligase complex; nucleoplasm; nucleolus; nucleus; cytosol; mitochondrion; endoplasmic reticulum; Golgi apparatus; perinuclear region of cytoplasm
Biological process	positive regulation of epidermal growth factor-activated receptor activity; positive regulation of protein targeting to mitochondrion; negative regulation of SREBP signaling pathway; cellular response to UV; negative regulation of triglyceride biosynthetic process; protein stabilization; negative regulation of hepatocyte proliferation; sister chromatid cohesion; cellular response to DNA damage stimulus; regulation of protein localization; positive regulation of oxidative stress-induced neuron intrinsic apoptotic signaling pathway; SCF-dependent proteasomal ubiquitin-dependent protein catabolic process; vasculature development; regulation of autophagy of mitochondrion; negative regulation of DNA endoreduplication; positive regulation of ubiquitin-protein transferase activity; positive regulation of ubiquitin-dependent protein catabolic process; protein ubiquitination; lipid homeostasis; positive regulation of ERK1 and ERK2 cascade; regulation of cell cycle G1/S phase transition; regulation of lipid storage; viral process; positive regulation of proteasomal protein catabolic process; positive regulation of protein ubiquitination; negative regulation of Notch signaling pathway; protein polyubiquitination; post-translational protein modification; negative regulation of osteoclast development; vasculogenesis; Notch signaling pathway; negative regulation of gene expression; ubiquitin recycling; lung development; protein destabilization; proteasome-mediated ubiquitin-dependent protein catabolic process; regulation of cell migration involved in sprouting angiogenesis; negative regulation of RNA polymerase II regulatory region sequence-specific DNA binding; regulation of circadian rhythm; rhythmic process
Sources:Amigo / QuickGO
Orthologs
Databases	NCBI: entry; OMA: entry
Species	Human	Mouse
Entrez	55294	50754
Ensembl	ENSG00000109670	ENSMUSG00000028086
UniProt	Q969H0	Q8VBV4
RefSeq (mRNA)	NM_001013415; NM_001257069; NM_018315; NM_033632; NM_001349798	NM_001177773; NM_001177774; NM_080428
RefSeq (protein)	NP_001013433; NP_001243998; NP_060785; NP_361014; NP_001336727	NP_001171244; NP_001171245; NP_536353
Location (UCSC)	Chr 4: 152.32 – 152.54 Mb	Chr 3: 84.72 – 84.89 Mb
PubMed search
- Wikidata
View/Edit Human	View/Edit Mouse

F-box/WD repeat-containing protein 7 is a protein that in humans is encoded by the FBXW7 gene.

== Function ==
This gene encodes a member of the F-box protein family which is characterized by an approximately 40 amino acid motif, the F-box. The F-box proteins constitute one of the four subunits of ubiquitin protein ligase complex called SCFs (SKP1-cullin-F-box), which function in phosphorylation-dependent ubiquitination. The F-box proteins are divided into 3 classes: Fbws containing WD40 domains, Fbls containing leucine-rich repeats, and Fbxs containing either different protein-protein interaction modules or no recognizable motifs. The protein encoded by this gene was previously referred to as FBX30, and belongs to the Fbws class; in addition to an F-box, this protein contains 7 tandem WD40 repeats. This protein binds directly to cyclin E and probably targets cyclin E for ubiquitin-mediated degradation. Other well established pro-proliferative targets of FBXW7 are c-Myc and Notch1. Mono-allelic mutations in this gene are detected in sporadic cancers [e.g., cholangiocarcinoma (35%), T-ALL (31%), endometrial carcinoma (16%), colorectal carcinoma (16%), bladder cancer (10%), gastric carcinoma (6%), lung squamous cell carcinoma (5%), etc.]. These findings implicate the gene's potential role in the pathogenesis of human cancers. Despite being commonly acknowledged as a haploinsufficient tumor suppressor, mutations are not found in some cancers, such as acute myeloid leukemia and multiple myeloma. One possibility is that FBXW7 substrate stabilization is detrimental in these neoplasms. For example, the FBXW7 substrate C/EBPα suppresses AML and multiple myelomas require constitutive NF-κB signaling; therefore, disruption of FBXW7-mediated ubiquitylation of IκBd in these tumors results in cell death.

Three transcript variants encoding three different isoforms have been found for this gene.

== Interactions ==
FBXW7 has been shown to interact with:

- MYB,
- PPARGC1A,
- Parkin (ligase), and
- SKP1A.
