= Downhill folding =

Protein folding process

Downhill folding is a process in which a protein folds without encountering any significant macroscopic free energy barrier. It is a key prediction of the folding funnel hypothesis of the energy landscape theory of proteins.

== Overview ==
Downhill folding is predicted to occur under conditions of extreme native bias, i.e. at low temperatures or in the absence of denaturants. This corresponds to the type 0 scenario in the energy landscape theory. At temperatures or denaturant concentrations close to their apparent midpoints, proteins may switch from downhill to two-state folding, the type 0 to type 1 transition.

Global downhill folding (or one-state folding) is another scenario in which the protein folds in the absence of a free energy barrier under all conditions. In other words, there is a unimodal population distribution at all temperatures and denaturant concentrations, suggesting a continuous unfolding transition in which different ensembles of structures populate at different conditions. This is in contrast to two-state folding, which assumes only two ensembles (folded and unfolded) and a sharp unfolding transition.

Free energy barriers in protein folding are predicted to be small because they arise as a result of compensation between large energetic and entropic terms. Non-synchronization between gain in stabilizing energy and loss in conformational entropy results in two-state folding, while a synchronization between these two terms as the folding proceeds results in downhill folding.

== Experimental studies ==
Transition state structures in two-state folding are not experimentally accessible (by definition they are the least populated along the reaction coordinate), but the folding sub-ensembles in downhill folding processes are theoretically distinguishable by spectroscopy. The 40-residue protein BBL, which is an independently folding domain from the E2 subunit of the 2-oxoglutarate dehydrogenase multi-enzyme complex of E. coli, has been experimentally shown to fold globally downhill. Also, a mutant of lambda repressor protein has been shown to shift from downhill to two-state upon changing the temperature/solvent conditions. However, the status of BBL as a downhill-folding protein, and by extension the existence of naturally occurring downhill folders, has been controversial. The current controversy arises from the fact that the only way a protein can be labeled as two-state or downhill is by analyzing the experimental data with models that explicitly deal with these two situations, i.e. by allowing the barrier heights to vary. Unfortunately, most of the experimental data so far have been analyzed with a simple chemical two-state model. In other words, the presence of a rather large free energy barrier has been pre-assumed, ruling out the possibility of identifying downhill or globally downhill protein folding. This is critical because any sigmoidal unfolding curve, irrespective of the degree of cooperativity, can be fit to a two-state model. Kinetically, the presence of a barrier guarantees a single-exponential, but not vice versa. Nevertheless, in some proteins such as the yeast phosphoglycerate kinase and a mutant human ubiquitin, non-exponential kinetics suggesting downhill folding have been observed.

A proposed solution to these problems is to develop models that can differentiate between the different situations, and identify simple but robust experimental criteria for identifying downhill folding proteins. These are outlined below.

== Equilibrium criteria ==
=== Differences in apparent melting temperatures ===
An analysis based on an extension of Zwanzig's model of protein folding indicates that global downhill folding proteins should reveal different apparent melting temperatures (Tms) when monitored by different techniques. This was experimentally confirmed in the protein BBL mentioned above. The unfolding followed by differential scanning calorimetry (DSC), circular dichroism (CD), fluorescence resonance energy transfer (FRET) and fluorescence all revealed different apparent melting temperatures. A wavelength-dependent melting temperature was also observed in the CD experiments. The data analyzed with a structure-based statistical mechanical model resulted in a unimodal population distribution at all temperatures, indicating a structurally uncoupled continuous unfolding process. The crucial issue in such experiments is to use probes that monitor different aspects of the structure. For example, DSC gives information on the heat capacity changes (and hence enthalpy) associated with unfolding, fluorescence on the immediate environment of the fluorophore, FRET on the average dimensions of the molecule and CD on the secondary structure.

A more stringent test would involve following the chemical shifts of each and every atom in the molecule by nuclear magnetic resonance (NMR) as a function of temperature/denaturant. Though time-consuming, this method does not require any specific model for the interpretation of data. The Tms for all the atoms should be identical within experimental error if the protein folds in a two-state manner. But for a protein that folds globally downhill the unfolding curves should have widely different Tms. The atomic unfolding behavior of BBL was found to follow the latter, showing a large spread in the Tms consistent with global downhill behavior. The Tms of some atoms were found to be similar to that of the global Tm (obtained from a low-resolution technique like CD or fluorescence), indicating that the unfolding of multiple atoms has to be followed, instead of a few as is frequently done in such experiments. The average atomic unfolding behavior was strikingly similar to that of CD, underlining the fact that unfolding curves of low resolution experiments are highly simplified representations of a more complex behavior.

=== Calorimetry and crossing baselines ===
Baselines frequently used in two-state fits correspond to the fluctuations in the folded or unfolded well. They are purely empirical as there is little or no information on how the folded or unfolded states' property changes with temperature/chemical denaturant. This assumes even more importance in case of DSC experiments as the changes in heat capacity correspond to both fluctuations in the protein ensemble and exposure of hydrophobic residues upon unfolding. The DSC profiles of many small fast-folding proteins are broad, with steep pre-transition slopes. Two-state fits to these profiles result in crossing of baselines indicating that the two-state assumption is no longer valid. This was recognized by Munoz and Sanchez-Ruiz, resulting in the development of the variable-barrier model. Instead of attempting a model-free inversion of the DSC profile to extract the underlying probability density function, they assumed a specific free energy functional with either one or two minima (similar to the Landau theory of phase transitions) thus enabling the extraction of free energy barrier heights. This model is the first of its kind in physical biochemistry that enables the determination of barrier heights from equilibrium experiments. Analysis of the DSC profile of BBL with this model resulted in zero barrier height, i.e. downhill folding, confirming the earlier result from the statistical mechanical model. When the variable-barrier model was applied to a set of proteins for which both the rate and DSC data are available, a very high correlation of 0.95 was obtained between the rates and barrier heights. Many of the proteins examined had small barriers (<20 kJ/mol) with baseline crossing evident for proteins that fold faster than 1 ms. This is in contrast to the traditional assumption that the free energy barrier between the folded and unfolded states are large.

== Simulations ==
Because downhill folding is difficult to measure experimentally, molecular dynamics and Monte Carlo simulations have been performed on fast-folding proteins to explore their folding kinetics. Proteins whose folding rate is at or near the folding "speed limit", whose timescales make their folding more accessible to simulation methods, may more commonly fold downhill. Simulation studies of the BBL protein imply that its rapid folding rate and very low energy barrier arise from a lack of cooperativity in the formation of native contacts during the folding process; that is, a low contact order. The link between lack of cooperativity and low contact order was also observed in the context of Monte Carlo lattice simulations These data suggest that the average number of "nonlocal contacts" per residue in a protein serves as an indicator of the barrier height, where very low nonlocal contact values imply downhill folding. Coarse-grained simulations by Knott and Chan also support the experimental observation of global downhill folding in BBL. A more recent study using constant-pH molecular dynamics (CpHMD) simulation has reconciled the opposing downhill and two-state folding mechanisms and found that the folding barrier vanishes at acidic pH conditions, leading to downhill folding.

== See also ==
- Dr. Victor Muñoz
