= Apomyoglobin =

Group of proteins

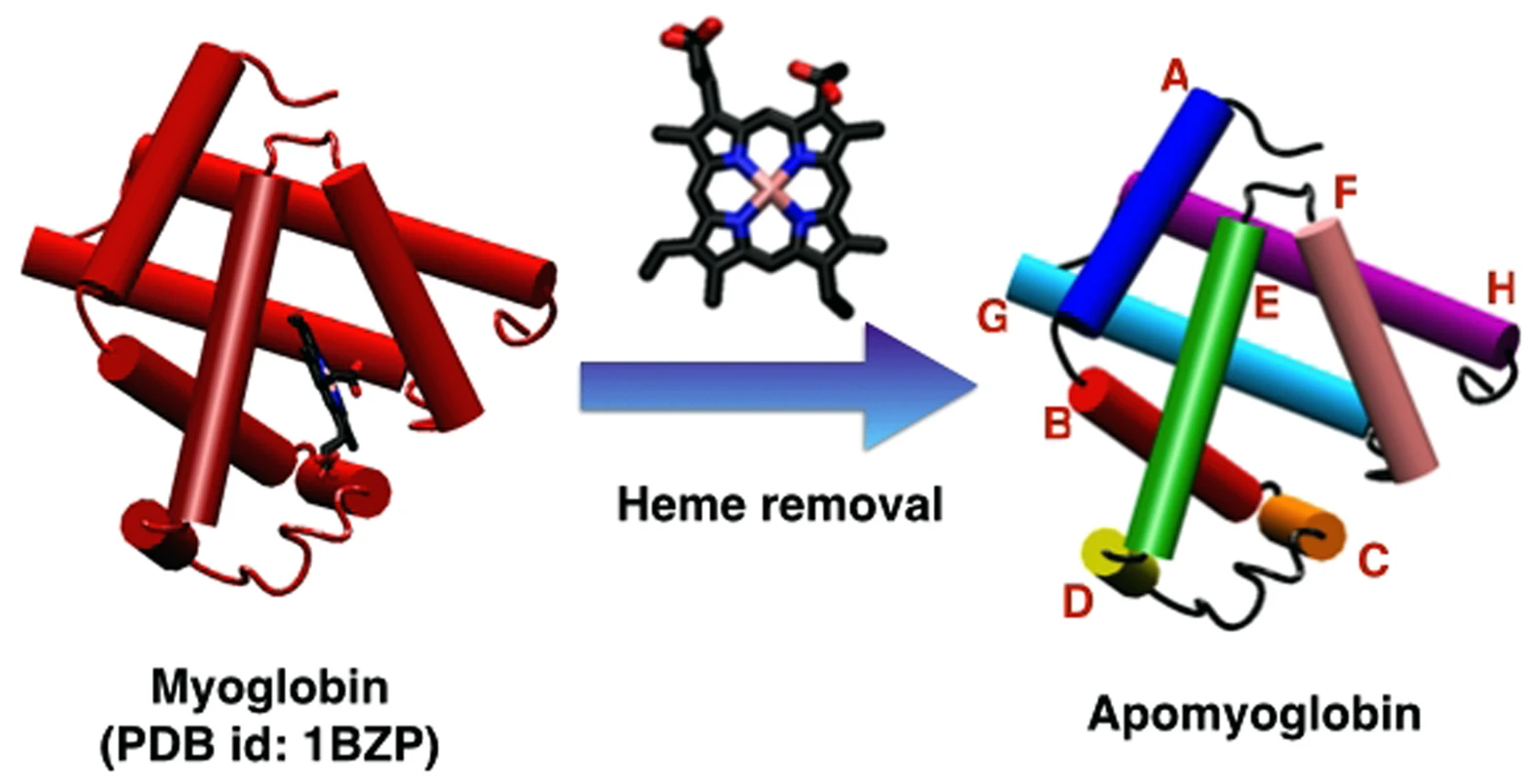
This is a representation of a cartoon that showcases myoglobin and apomyoglobin. It also shows individual helices with A to H labeling. It is also showcasing the removal of a heme group from myoglobin to show apomyoglobin instead.

Apomyoglobin is a representative of a group of relatively small, α-helical and globular proteins. It has been extensively employed as a model system for protein folding and stability studies. Apomyoglobin is a type of myoglobin that does not have a heme group. This means that apomyoglobin lacks the haem groups that would have their iron atoms bind to Oxygen. There is a possibility, however, that apomyoglobin can bind to other different cofactors that is not a haem group. It also serves as an intermediate of myoglobin in its biosynthesis process. Apomyoglobin can be found in certain solutions with a neutral pH, it has a spatial structure that is compact and unique. Apomyoglobin also has an extended hydrophobic core. Apomyoglobin's structure has also been found to be similar to that of holomyoglobin's structure. Apomyoglobin also has an extended hydrophobic core. Apomyoglobin is produced in the sarcoplasm and is stated as being a hydrophilic protein. This means that the protein has a high affinity for water.

== Folding and unfolding at different pHs ==
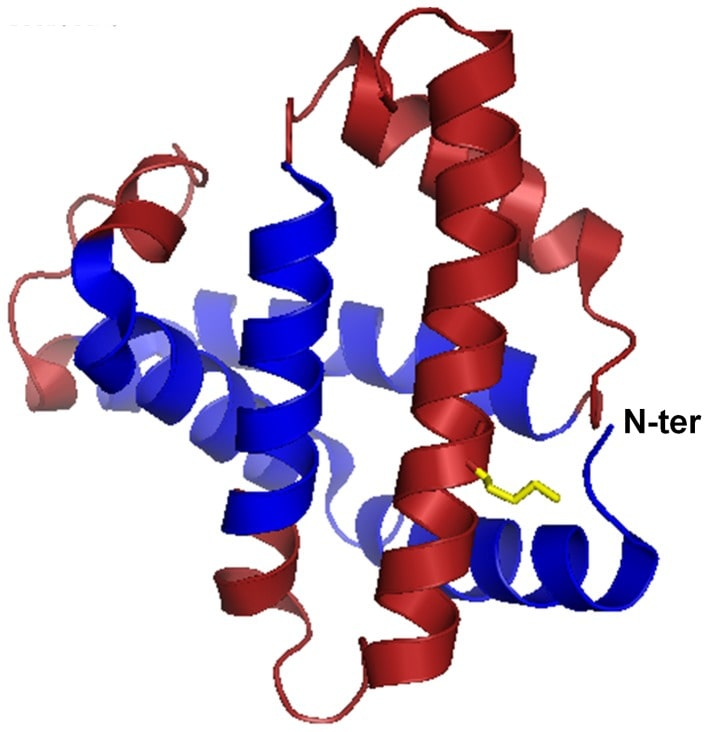
This is a picture of an Apomyoglobin structure. It specifically shows cross-linking in glycated W7FW17F apomyoglobin.

Apomyoglobin folds slowly (taking around 2 seconds) in comparison to other proteins. Apomyoglobin is an ideal protein to take into consideration when looking at folding in proteins. This is because it has no cysteines, no disulfides, and also does not exhibit any proline isomerization, which makes it easier to label. The protein contains primary, secondary, tertiary (not stable), and a quaternary structure at different pHs.

Apomyoglobin also has different folding states at different pH's. At a pH of 6, the F helix of the monomer is not folded completely. At this pH of 6, both secondary and tertiary structures are contained by the folded protein. At a pH of 4, apomyoglobin forms a structure known as "molten globule" and becomes more stabilized. A molten globule, in other words, is where the tertiary structure of the protein is lost, but the secondary structure is allowed to remain and becomes stronger. At a pH of 2, the monomer protein becomes unfolded, yet it still has some small amount of helical structure. The important thing to note about the apomyoglobin monomer when it comes to folding and unfolding, is that it unfolds backwards at acidic pHs but it can also be refolded as easily from acidic or alkaline solutions.

== The kinetic folding pathway intermediate ==
Apomyoglobin is stated as having eight total helices, with the labels (A, B, C, D, E, F, G and H). These helices, ranging from A to H, are directly involved in what is known as helix-helix interactions (13 total and hydrophobic) in its native folding state. When looking at the first-approximation to apomyoglobin's folding kinetics (calculated using a diffusion-collision model), the two small helices D and C can be disregarded. To further explain, the diffusion-collision model is a model that states that the process of folding for four-helix proteins should be placed in randomized helix-helix collisions. This leaves the apomyoglobin as only having A, B, E, F, G, H helices as part of its protein, meaning that the only possible interactions left are BG, GH, BE, FH, and AE.

The kinetic folding pathway of apomyoglobin, showcased that the folding of the protein proceeded forward through a "burst phase" intermediate, delineated via 2D^{1}H NMR spectra. This specific kinetic intermediate, formed within 6 ms (milliseconds), contained only parts A, G, and H helices. Furthermore, it can be said that the folding kinetics of apomyoglobin are transitions among the 64 states that commonly occur when breaking or forming one of the helix-helix interactions. Apomyoglobin tends to collapse rapidly when the initiation of folding occurs into an intermediate that contains A, G, and H helices. This kinetic pathway folding of apomyoglobin results in the A(B)GH intermediate occurring.

It can also be shown that the folding kinetics associated with apomyoglobin can be tied to nascent helices through a network of diffusion-collision steps. These steps are stated as being: G + H <-> GH + A <-> AGH + B <-> A(B)GH.

== Interactions with membranes ==
There was a research study conducted by a group of scientists, that studied the way apomyoglobin interacts with membranes. The purpose of the study, specifically, was to determine if apomyoglobin interacted with the membranes to extract a heme group from the lipid bilayer of the membrane. This was done by looking at apomyoglobin's interactions with large unilamellar vesicles (LUVs), and then measuring the impact that apomyoglobin's membrane binding has to that of the rate of heme uptake.

The results of the research conducted points to apomyoglobin and membrane interactions being heavily pH dependent. It was also found that apomyoglobins may require the presence of phospholipids that are of an anionic state. All of the conditions that were found that showcased a positive interaction between apomyoglobin with a membrane, pointed towards the destabilization of apomyoglobin and a decrease in the rate of the protein's binding with heme. This further sealed the narrative that the interactions between membranes and the protein is not necessary for holomyoglobin formation. It was also concluded that the molten globule state of apomyoglobin is an important step in making the hydrophobic regions of the protein accessible when interacting with the membrane.

== In sperm whales ==
Apomyoglobin can be found in certain animals, one of the main animals being sperm whales. The apomyoglobin from sperm whales is used for studying ligand binding, folding in proteins, and protein stability. Apomyoglobin found in sperm whales binds pigments similar to chlorophyll, while its counterpart Myoglobin, has never really encountered these pigments. It was also discovered that apomyoglobin is around 20 to 100 times more resistant to GdmCl (Guanidinium chloride) denaturation. When comparing sperm whale apomyoglobin to other mammal apomyoglobin, it can be stated that sperm whale apomyoglobin is much more resistant to GdmCl-induced denaturation. Sperm whale apomyoglobin has also been vastly used in studies involving comprehensive studies of protein unfolding. There is also specific whale sperm apomyoglobin mutations that give rise amyloid fibrils at a pH 7. Examples of mutations that would give rise to this are mutations such as, the replacement of Trp-7 and Trp-14 by two Phe's. Apomyoglobins found in deep-diving whales are far more stable than those from mammals found on land or those who swim on the surface.

== See also ==
- Bovine serum albumin
- Myoglobin
- Molten globule
- Hydrophobic collapse
