= CLIP4 =

Protein-coding gene found in humans

Identifiers
- Aliases: CLIP4, RSNL2, CAP-Gly domain containing linker protein family member 4
- External IDs: MGI: 1919100; GeneCards: CLIP4
Available structures
PDB	Ortholog search: PDBe RCSB
PDB	List of PDB id codes 2Z0W

Gene location (Human)
Chr.	Chromosome 2 (human)
Band	2p23.2	Start	29,097,705 bp
Band	2p23.2	End	29,199,777 bp

Gene location (Mouse)
Chr.	Chromosome 17 (mouse)
Band	17|17 E1.3	Start	72,075,468 bp
Band	17|17 E1.3	End	72,171,268 bp
RNA expression pattern
Bgee	Human / Mouse (ortholog); Top expressed in: secondary oocyte; skin of thigh; Skeletal muscle tissue of biceps brachii; Skeletal muscle tissue of rectus abdominis; germinal epithelium; skin of hip; gastrocnemius muscle; sural nerve; skin of abdomen; external globus pallidus / Top expressed in: seminiferous tubule; cardiac muscle tissue of left ventricle; spermatid; digastric muscle; soleus muscle; sternocleidomastoid muscle; extensor digitorum longus muscle; skin of external ear; masseter muscle; temporal muscle; More reference expression data
BioGPS	n/a
Orthologs
Databases	NCBI: entry; OMA: entry
Species	Human	Mouse
Entrez	79745	78785
Ensembl	ENSG00000115295	ENSMUSG00000024059
UniProt	Q8N3C7	Q8CI96
RefSeq (mRNA)	NM_001287527; NM_001287528; NM_024692	NM_001271483; NM_001271484; NM_030179; NM_175378
RefSeq (protein)	NP_001274456; NP_001274457; NP_078968	NP_001258412; NP_001258413; NP_084455; NP_780587
Location (UCSC)	Chr 2: 29.1 – 29.2 Mb	Chr 17: 72.08 – 72.17 Mb
PubMed search
- Wikidata
View/Edit Human	View/Edit Mouse

CAP-Gly Domain Containing Linker Protein Family Member 4 is a protein that in humans is encoded by the CLIP4 gene. In terms of conserved domains, the CLIP4 gene contains primarily ankyrin repeats and the eponymous CAP-Gly domains. The structure of the CLIP4 protein is largely made up of coil, with alpha helices dominating the rest of the protein. CLIP4 mRNA expression occurs largely in the adrenal cortex and atrioventricular node. The literature encompassing CLIP4's conserved domains and paralogs points toward microtubule regulation as a possible function of CLIP4.

== Gene ==
The human CLIP4 gene, also known as Restin-Like Protein 2 (RSNL2), is located on the plus strand of the short (p) arm of chromosome 2 at region 2, band 3 from base pair 29,096,676 to base pair 29,189,643. CLIP4 is 92,968 base pairs in length and consists of 23 exons.

== Transcript ==
=== Transcript variants ===
Transcript	mRNA size (nucleotides)
CLIP4 transcript variant 1	4299
CLIP4 transcript variant 2	4295
CLIP4 transcript variant 3	2353

== Protein ==
The human CLIP4 protein is 705 amino acids in length and is composed of two main types of conserved domains: Two CAP-Gly domains and numerous ankyrin repeats. The secondary structure of CLIP4 consists largely of random coil, with alpha helices as the second-most abundant structure and beta sheets as the third-most abundant structure.

The isoelectronic point of the unprocessed CLIP4 protein is slightly basic (8.62 pI), meaning there is a slight excess of basic amino acids compared to acidic amino acids. The molecular weight is about 65 kD. The most abundant amino acid in CLIP4 is Serine, which makes up 10.7% of the protein. Aligned matching blocks of separated, tandem, and periodic repeats are found between positions 340-345 and 542-547, as well as 447-547 and 564-568. The unusual 9-figure periodic element of a singular Lysine followed by eight other amino acids occurs five times within the protein when compared to the swp23s.q dataset. Another unusual phenomenon is a 7-figure periodic element of a negatively charged amino acid followed by six other hydrophobic amino acids, which occurs six times within the protein when compared to the swp23s.q dataset. There are two instances of Serine spacing and two instances of Phenylalanine spacing that comprise unusually large distances when compared to the swp23s.q dataset.

=== Protein isoforms ===
Isoform	Protein size (amino acids)
CLIP4 isoform 1	705
CLIP4 isoform 2	599

== Expression ==
CLIP4 RNA expression is consistently measured to a high degree in the thyroid. Additionally, high degrees of transcription occur in the adrenal cortex and atrioventricular node. The Human Protein Atlas points toward high RNA expression values in the muscle tissues, as well as some in the skin, endocrine tissues, and proximal digestive tract. Greatest protein expression values appeared in the muscle tissues as well, in addition to some in the lung, gastrointestinal tract, liver & gallbladder, and bone marrow & lymphoid tissues.

CLIP4 protein expression seems to be highly expressed during Ada3 deficiency. There also exists a higher trend towards higher CLIP4 expression in the absence of U28.

== Regulation ==
=== Gene ===
==== Common transcription factor binding sites ====
These transcription factors were chosen and organized based on proximity to the promoter and matrix similarity.

Transcription factor	Detailed Matrix Info	Anchor base	Matrix similarity	Sequence
NOLF	Early B-cell factor 1	17	0.98	taagagTCCCcagggcagaaaca
PAX2	Zebrafish PAX2 paired domain protein	18	0.8	aagagtccccagggcagAAACaa
AP2F	Transcription factor AP-2, alpha	16	0.98	ctgcCCTGgggactc
AP2F	Transcription factor AP-2, beta	16	0.899	gagTCCCcagggcag
SORY	SRY (sex-determining region Y) box 9, dimeric binding sites	35	0.768	aAACAaaatccagtgagggagag
HNF6	CUT-homeodomain transcription factor Onecut-2	32	0.827	aaacaaAATCcagtgag
PAX5	B-cell-specific activator protein	40	0.815	acaaaaTCCAgtgagggagagatgcaggg
ZF16	PR/SET domain 15	36	0.852	aaatccagtgaGGGA
SORY	HMGI(Y) high-mobility-group protein I (Y), architectural transcription factor organizing the framework of a nuclear protein-DNA transcriptional complex	78	0.945	tggaAATTttctaccttaggagc
NFAT	Nuclear factor of activated T-cells 5	83	0.955	ttttGGAAattttctacct
NFAT	Nuclear factor of activated T-cells 5	83	0.871	aggtAGAAaatttccaaaa
CEBP	CCAAT/enhancer binding protein (C/EBP), epsilon	89	0.975	agccttttGGAAatt
CAAT	Cellular and viral CCAAT box	110	0.91	gcagCCATttaatct
CAAT	Avian C-type LTR CCAAT box	165	0.875	cccaCCAAgcagtgg
CEBP	CCAAT/enhancer binding protein (C/EBP), gamma	650	0.866	ctaaTTGCtcaacgt
CEBP	CCAAT/enhancer binding protein alpha	651	0.971	cacgttgaGCAAtta
VTBP	Mammalian C-type LTR TATA box	680	0.903	tgctgTAAAaggcctaa
TF2B	Transcription factor II B (TFIIB) recognition element	983	1	ccgCGCC
TF2B	Transcription factor II B (TFIIB) recognition element	1157	1	ccgCGCC
TF2B	Transcription factor II B (TFIIB) recognition element	1228	1	ccgCGCC

=== Transcriptional ===
The human CLIP4 mRNA sequence has 12 stem-loop structures in its 5' UTR and 13 stem-loop structures in its 3' UTR. Of those secondary structures, there are 12 conserved stem-loop secondary structures in the 5'UTR as well as 1 conserved stem-loop secondary structure in the 3' UTR.

=== Protein ===
The human CLIP4 protein is localized within the cellular nuclear membrane. CLIP4 does not have a signal peptide due to its intracellular localization. It also does not have N-linked glycosylation sites for that same reason. CLIP4 is not cleaved. However, numerous O-linked glycosylation sites are present. A high density of phosphorylation sites are present in the 400-599 amino acid positions on the CLIP4 protein, although many are also present throughout the rest of the protein.

== Function ==
CAP-Gly domains are often associated with microtubule regulation. In addition, ankyrin repeats are known to mediate protein-protein interactions. Furthermore, CLIP1, a paralog of CLIP4 in humans, is known to bind to microtubules and regulate the microtubule cytoskeleton. The CLIP4 protein is also predicted to interact with various microtubule-associated proteins. As a result, it is likely that the CLIP4 protein, although uncharacterized, is associated with microtubule regulation.

== Interacting Proteins ==
The CLIP4 protein is predicted to interact with many proteins associated with microtubules; namely, MAPRE1, MAPRE2, and MAPRE3. It is also predicted to interact with CKAP5 and DCTN1, a cytoskeleton-associated protein and dynactin-associated protein respectively.

== Clinical significance ==
=== Importance in various cancers ===
CLIP4 activity is correlated with the spread of renal cell carcinomas (RCCs) within the host and could therefore be a potential biomarker for RCC metastasis in cancer patients. Additionally, measurement of promotor methylation levels of CLIP4 using a Global Methylation DNA Index reveals that higher methylation of CLIP4 is associated with an increase in severity of gastritis to possibly gastric cancer. This indicates that CLIP4 could be used for early detection of gastric cancer. A similar finding was also documented for prostate cancer, in which CLIP4 was found to be hypermethylated in patients with prostate cancer.

=== Importance in other diseases ===
The presence of CLIP4 was found to be highly increased in samples with predicted severe fibrosis as a result of Chronic Hepatitis C virus (HCV). Additionally, the presence of CLIP4 as a novel self-antigen in Systemic Lupus Arythematosus points to it having a potential role in the disease mechanism.

== Homology ==
=== CLIP4 orthologs ===
These orthologs were chosen and organized based on estimated date of divergence from the human protein as well as the global sequence identity.

Binomial Nomenclature	Common Name	Taxonomic Group	Estimated DoD from Human (MYA)	Accession Number	Sequence Length (AA)	Global Sequence Identity to Human Protein (%)	Global Sequence Similarity to Human Protein (%)
Homo sapiens (Hsa)	Human	Primate	0	AAP97312	601	100	100
Aotus nancymaae (Ana)	Ma's night monkey	Primate	43.2	XP_012330895	704	83.5	83.7
Sorex araneus (Sar)	Common shrew	Eulipotyphla	96	XP_004620056	707	74	78.5
Antrostomus carolinensis (Aca)	Chuck-will's-widow	Aves	312	XP_028942997	702	66.5	75.4
Gekko japonicus (Gja)	Schlegel's Japanese gecko	Reptilia	312	XP_015270366	702	63.8	73.1
Rhinatrema bivittatum (Rbi)	Two-lined caecilian	Amphibians	351.8	XP_029448862	707	59.5	70.5
Callorhinchus milii (Cmi)	Elephant shark	Chondrichthyes	473	XP_007895016	715	52.5	65.6
Branchiostoma floridae (Bfl)	Florida lancelet	Leptocardii	684	XP_002606824	481	40.4	52.8
Saccoglossus kowalevskii (Sko)	Acorn worm	Enteropneusta	684	XP_006822686	648	35.7	47.5
Ixodes scapularis (Isc)	Black-legged tick	Arachnid	797	XP_029831090	527	38.9	53
Limulus polyphemus (Lpo)	Atlantic horseshoe crab	Arachnid	797	XP_013786376	462	38	51.6
Lottia gigantea (Lgi)	Owl limpet	Gastropods	797	XP_009046843	669	36.3	49.3
Mizuhopecten yessoensis (Mye)	Yesso scallop	Bivalvia	797	XP_021359747	633	35.4	47.2
Parasteatoda tepidariorum (Pte)	Common house spider	Arachnid	797	XP_015914966	616	34.7	47.6
Aplysia californica (Aca)	California sea hare	Gastropods	797	XP_012945346	653	33.7	45.7
Crassostrea virginica (Cvi)	Eastern oyster	Bivalvia	797	XP_022315879	646	32.7	45.1
Tetranychus urticae (Tur)	Two-spotted spider mite	Arachnid	797	XP_015790536	652	31.9	43.5
Centruroides sculpturatus (Csc)	Bark scorpion	Arachnid	797	XP_023229484	605	30.6	43.4
Penaeus vannamei (Pva)	Pacific white shrimp	Malacostracans	797	XP_027206746	681	22.9	34
Monosiga brevicollis (Mbr)	Choanoflagellate	Choanoflagellatea	1023	XP_001748580	576	25.3	40.8
