= Víctor Muñoz =

Victor Muñoz may refer to:

- Víctor Muñoz Reyes, president of the Central Bank of Bolivia in 1936–1937
- Víctor Muñoz (writer) (born 1950), Guatemalan author, winner of the 2013 Miguel Ángel Asturias National Prize in Literature
- Víctor Muñoz (footballer, born 1957), Spanish footballer and manager
- Victor Muñoz (biochemist), Spanish biochemist
- Víctor Manuel Muñoz, Colombian industrial engineer and public official
- Victor Muñoz (footballer, born 1990), Spanish footballer
- Víctor Muñoz (footballer, born 2003), Spanish footballer
