= José Onuchic =

Brazilian-American physicist

José Nelson Onuchic
- Born: Sao Paulo, Brazil
- Education: Universidade de Sao Paulo, Sao Carlos, Sao Paulo, Brazil; California Institute of Technology
- Awards: International Centre for Theoretical Physics Prize (1989) Beckman Young Investigator Award (1992); Member National Academy of Sciences (2006); Fellow American Academy of Arts and Sciences (2009); Fellow Brazilian Academy of Sciences (2009); Fellow of the Biophysical Society (2013) Biophysical Society Founders Award (2023)
- Scientific career
- Fields: Biological Physics, Biophysics
- Workplaces: Rice University
- Thesis: New aspects of the theory of electron transfer reaction dynamics (March 1987)
- Doctoral advisor: John J. Hopfield
- Doctoral students: Margaret S. Cheung

José Nelson Onuchic (born Sao Paulo, Brazil) is a Brazilian and American physicist, the Harry C & Olga K Wiess Professor of Physics at Rice University. He does research in molecular biophysics, condensed matter chemistry, and genetic networks, and is known for the folding funnel hypothesis stating that the native state of a protein is a deep minimum of free energy for the protein's natural conditions among its possible configurations. He was the college master for Lovett College at Rice University from 2014 to 2019.

== Education ==
Onuchic studied at the University of São Paulo, where he earned a B.S. degree in electrical engineering (1980) and in physics in 1981. He subsequently earned his Master of Science degree in applied physics in 1982. He studied at the California Institute of Technology under John Hopfield, earning his doctorate in 1987.

== Academic career ==
After postdoctoral studies at the University of California, Santa Barbara, and a brief faculty position returning to the University of São Paulo, he moved to the University of California, San Diego in 1990. He joined Rice University as the Harry C & Olga K Wiess Professor of Physics and Astronomy in 2011.

== Awards and honors ==
Onuchic received a Beckman Young Investigators Award in 1992. He became a Fellow of the American Physical Society in 1995 and of the American Academy of Arts and Sciences in 2009. In 2012, he was named a Fellow of the Biophysical Society for "developing the widely recognized and highly regarded theory of energy landscapes and funnels that directs protein folding." He became a member of the U. S. National Academy of Sciences in 2006, of the Brazilian Academy of Sciences in 2009, and of the Pontifical Academy of Sciences in 2020.
