= Conformational entropy =

Entropy associated with a molecule's possible conformations

In chemical thermodynamics, conformational entropy is the entropy associated with the number of conformations of a molecule. The concept is most commonly applied to biological macromolecules such as proteins and RNA, but also be used for polysaccharides and other molecules. To calculate the conformational entropy, the possible conformations of the molecule may first be discretized into a finite number of states, usually characterized by unique combinations of certain structural parameters, each of which has been assigned an energy. In proteins, backbone dihedral angles and side chain rotamers are commonly used as parameters, and in RNA the base pairing pattern may be used. These characteristics are used to define the degrees of freedom (in the statistical mechanics sense of a possible "microstate"). The conformational entropy associated with a particular structure or state, such as an alpha-helix, a folded or an unfolded protein structure, is then dependent on the probability of the occupancy of that structure.

The entropy of heterogeneous random coil or denatured proteins is significantly higher than that of the tertiary structure of its folded native state. In particular, the conformational entropy of the amino acid side chains in a protein is thought to be a major contributor to the energetic stabilization of the denatured state and thus a barrier to protein folding. However, a recent study has shown that side-chain conformational entropy can stabilize native structures among alternative compact structures. The conformational entropy of RNA and proteins can be estimated; for example, empirical methods to estimate the loss of conformational entropy in a particular side chain on incorporation into a folded protein can roughly predict the effects of particular point mutations in a protein. Side-chain conformational entropies can be defined as Boltzmann sampling over all possible rotameric states:

$$S = -R \sum_{i} p_{i} \ln p_{i}$$

where R is the gas constant and p_{i} is the probability of a residue being in rotamer i.

The limited conformational range of proline residues lowers the conformational entropy of the denatured state and thus stabilizes the native states. A correlation has been observed between the thermostability of a protein and its proline residue content.

== See also ==
- Configuration entropy
- Folding funnel
- Loop entropy
- Molten globule
- Protein folding
