= Cyrus Levinthal =

American molecular biologist (1922–1990)

- Born: May 2, 1922; Philadelphia, Pennsylvania, U.S.
- Died: November 4, 1990 (aged 68); Manhattan, New York, U.S.
- Known for: Levinthal's paradox
- Scientific career
- Fields: Molecular biology
- Institutions: University of Michigan; MIT; Columbia University
- Thesis: A Study of Protons Ejected from Nuclei by High Energy Gamma Rays (1950)
- Doctoral advisors: A. Carl Helmholz; Wolfgang K. H. Panofsky
- Doctoral students: Joel Sussman, Shoshana Wodak

Cyrus Levinthal (May 2, 1922 – November 4, 1990) was an American molecular biologist. He is best known for the eponymous thought experiment Levinthal's paradox, which concerns the folding of protein structure.

== Biography ==
Levinthal graduated with a Ph.D. in physics from University of California, Berkeley and taught physics at the University of Michigan for seven years before moving to the Massachusetts Institute of Technology (MIT) in 1957. In 1968 he joined Columbia University as the Chairman and from 1969, professor of the newly established Department of Biological Sciences, where he remained until his death from lung cancer in 1990. In 1970, he was elected to the National Academy of Sciences.

== Research ==
While at MIT Levinthal made significant discoveries in molecular genetics relating to the mechanisms of DNA replication, the relationship between genes and proteins, and the nature of messenger RNA.

At Columbia Levinthal applied computers to the 3-dimensional imaging of biological structures such as proteins. He is considered the father of computer graphical display of protein structure.

== Discoveries and accomplishments ==
See Levinthal's paradox.
