= Margaret S. Cheung =

Taiwanese-American biological physicist

Margaret Shun Cheung is a Taiwanese-American biological physicist whose research combines computational and theoretical approaches to understand protein folding and the dynamic behavior of protein complexes. A particular focus of her recent research has been calmodulin and its role in calcium signaling in the brain. She is a computational scientist in the Environmental Molecular Sciences Laboratory of the Pacific Northwest National Laboratory, and an affiliate professor in the Department of Physics at the University of Washington.

== Education and career ==
Cheung majored in chemistry at National Taiwan University, graduating in 1994. She completed a Ph.D. in physics in 2003 at the University of California, San Diego, with a dissertation on protein folding supervised by José Onuchic.

From 2003 to 2006 she was a Sloan postdoctoral fellow at the University of Maryland, College Park, working on protein–protein interaction with Devarajan (Dave) Thirumalai. She joined the University of Houston in 2006 as an assistant professor of physics, and was promoted to associate professor in 2012 and full professor in 2017. In 2018 she was named as the Moores Professor of Physics. She also began an affiliation with Rice University in 2012, as a senior scientist in the Center for Theoretical Biological Physics, and since 2018 added an affiliation as an adjunct professor of bioengineering at Rice; both affiliations are ongoing.

In 2020 she went on leave from the University of Houston to join the Pacific Northwest National Laboratory and University of Washington, and her position at the University of Houston ended in 2022.

== Recognition ==
Chung was named as a Fellow of the American Physical Society (APS) in 2013, after a nomination from the APS Division of Biological Physics, "for her contributions to modeling and simulations necessary to achieve a comprehensive understanding of the folding, structure and function of a protein in a cellular environment".

In 2019 she and her student at the University of Houston, Andrei G. Gasic, received the Robert S. Hyer Graduate Student and Mentor Award of the APS Texas Section, "for their work on development of a computational model to study the effects of molecular crowding, hydrodynamic pressure, and temperature on folding and functionality of phosphoglycerate kinase (PGK)".
