= Hydrophobic-polar protein folding model =

Lattice model of protein folding

The hydrophobic-polar protein folding model is a highly simplified model for examining protein folds in space. First proposed by Ken Dill in 1985, it is the most known type of lattice protein: it stems from the observation that hydrophobic interactions between amino acid residues are the driving force for proteins folding into their native state. All amino acid types are classified as either hydrophobic (H) or polar (P), and the folding of a protein sequence is defined as a self-avoiding walk in a 2D or 3D lattice. The HP model imitates the hydrophobic effect by assigning a negative (favorable) weight to interactions between adjacent, non-covalently bound H residues. Proteins that have minimum energy are assumed to be in their native state.

The HP model can be expressed in both two and three dimensions, generally with square lattices, although triangular lattices have been used as well. It has also been studied on general regular lattices.

Randomized search algorithms are often used to tackle the HP folding problem. This includes stochastic, evolutionary algorithms like the Monte Carlo method, genetic algorithms, and ant colony optimization. While no method has been able to calculate the experimentally determined minimum energetic state for long protein sequences, the most advanced methods today are able to come close. For some model variants/lattices, it is possible to compute optimal structures (with maximal number of H-H contacts) using constraint programming techniques as e.g. implemented within the CPSP-tools webserver.

Even though the HP model abstracts away many of the details of protein folding, it is still an NP-hard problem on both 2D and 3D square lattices.

A Monte Carlo method, named FRESS, was developed and appears to perform well on HP models.

== See also ==
- Protein structure prediction
- Lattice proteins
