= Native contact =

Aspect of protein folding

In protein folding, a native contact is a contact between the side chains of two amino acids that are not neighboring in the amino acid sequence (i.e., they are more than four residues apart in the primary sequence in order to remove trivial i to i+4 contacts along alpha helices) but are spatially close in the protein's native state tertiary structure. The fraction of native contacts reproduced in a particular structure is often used as a reaction coordinate for measuring the deviation from the native state of structures produced during molecular dynamics simulations or in benchmarks of protein structure prediction methods.

The contact order is a measure of the locality of a protein's native contacts; that is, the sequence distance between amino acids that form contacts. Proteins with low contact order are thought to fold faster and some may be candidates for downhill folding.
