= Random coil =

Polymer conformation in which all bonded subunits are oriented randomly

In polymer chemistry, a random coil is a conformation of polymers where the monomer subunits are oriented randomly while still being bonded to adjacent units. It is not one specific shape, but a statistical distribution of shapes for all the chains in a population of macromolecules. The conformation's name is derived from the idea that, in the absence of specific, stabilizing interactions, a polymer backbone will "sample" all possible conformations randomly. Many unbranched, linear homopolymers—either in solution, or above their melting temperatures— assume (approximate) random coils.

== Random walk model: the Gaussian chain ==
Short random chain

There are an enormous number of different ways in which a chain can be curled around in a relatively compact shape, like an unraveling ball of twine with much open space, and comparatively few ways it can be more or less stretched out. So, if each conformation has an equal probability or statistical weight, chains are much more likely to be ball-like than they are to be extended –a purely entropic effect. In an ensemble of chains, most of them will, therefore, be loosely balled up. This is the type of shape any one of them will have most of the time.

Consider a linear polymer to be a freely-jointed chain with N subunits, each of length $\scriptstyle\ell$, that occupy zero volume, so that no part of the chain excludes another from any location. One can regard the segments of each such chain in an ensemble as performing a random walk (or "random flight") in three dimensions, limited only by the constraint that each segment must be joined to its neighbors. This is the ideal chain mathematical model. It is clear that the maximum, fully extended length L of the chain is $\scriptstyle N\,\times\,\ell$. If we assume that each possible chain conformation has an equal statistical weight, it can be shown that the probability P(r) of a polymer chain in the population to have distance r between the ends will obey a characteristic distribution described by the formula

$$P(r) = 4 \pi r^2 \left(\frac{3}{2\; \pi \langle r^2\rangle}\right)^{3/2} \;e^{-\,\frac{3r^2}{2\langle r^2\rangle}}$$

where ${\langle r^2\rangle}$ is the mean of ${r^2}$.

The average (root mean square) end-to-end distance for the chain, $\scriptstyle \sqrt{\langle r^2\rangle}$, turns out to be $\scriptstyle\ell$ times the square root of N — in other words, the average distance scales with N ^{0.5}.

== Real polymers ==
A real polymer is not freely-jointed. A -C-C- single bond has a fixed tetrahedral angle of 109.5 degrees. The value of L is well-defined for, say, a fully extended polyethylene or nylon, but it is less than N x l because of the zig-zag backbone. There is, however, free rotation about many chain bonds. The model above can be enhanced. A longer, "effective" unit length can be defined such that the chain can be regarded as freely-jointed, along with a smaller N, such that the constraint L = N x l is still obeyed. It, too, gives a Gaussian distribution. However, specific cases can also be precisely calculated. The average end-to-end distance for freely-rotating (not freely-jointed) polymethylene (polyethylene with each -C-C- considered as a subunit) is l times the square root of 2N, an increase by a factor of about 1.4. Unlike the zero volume assumed in a random walk calculation, all real polymers' segments occupy space because of the van der Waals radii of their atoms, including bulky substituent groups that interfere with bond rotations. This can also be taken into account in calculations. All such effects increase the mean end-to-end distance.

Because their polymerization is stochastically driven, chain lengths in any real population of synthetic polymers will obey a statistical distribution. In that case, we should take N to be an average value. Also, many polymers have random branching.

Even with corrections for local constraints, the random walk model ignores steric interference between chains, and between distal parts of the same chain. A chain often cannot move from a given conformation to a closely related one by a small displacement because one part of it would have to pass through another part, or through a neighbor. We may still hope that the ideal-chain, random-coil model will be at least a qualitative indication of the shapes and dimensions of real polymers in solution, and in the amorphous state, as long as there are only weak physicochemical interactions between the monomers. This model, and the Flory-Huggins Solution Theory, for which Paul Flory received the Nobel Prize in Chemistry in 1974, ostensibly apply only to ideal, dilute solutions. But there is reason to believe (e.g., neutron diffraction studies) that excluded volume effects may cancel out, so that, under certain conditions, chain dimensions in amorphous polymers have approximately the ideal, calculated size When separate chains interact cooperatively, as in forming crystalline regions in solid thermoplastics, a different mathematical approach must be used.

Stiffer polymers such as helical polypeptides, Kevlar, and double-stranded DNA can be treated by the worm-like chain model.

Even copolymers with monomers of unequal length will distribute in random coils if the subunits lack any specific interactions. The parts of branched polymers may also assume random coils.

Below their melting temperatures, most thermoplastic polymers (polyethylene, nylon, etc.) have amorphous regions in which the chains approximate random coils, alternating with regions that are crystalline. The amorphous regions contribute elasticity and the crystalline regions contribute strength and rigidity.

More complex polymers such as proteins, with various interacting chemical groups attached to their backbones, self-assemble into well-defined structures. But segments of proteins, and polypeptides that lack secondary structure, are often assumed to exhibit a random-coil conformation in which the only fixed relationship is the joining of adjacent amino acid residues by a peptide bond. This is not actually the case, since the ensemble will be energy weighted due to interactions between amino acid side-chains, with lower-energy conformations being present more frequently. In addition, even arbitrary sequences of amino acids tend to exhibit some hydrogen bonding and secondary structure. For this reason, the term "statistical coil" is occasionally preferred. The conformational entropy of the random-coil stabilizes the unfolded protein state and represents main free energy contribution that opposes to protein folding.

== Spectroscopy ==
A random-coil conformation can be detected using spectroscopic techniques. The arrangement of the planar amide bonds results in a distinctive signal in circular dichroism. The chemical shift of amino acids in a random-coil conformation is well known in nuclear magnetic resonance (NMR). Deviations from these signatures often indicates the presence of some secondary structure, rather than complete random coil. Furthermore, there are signals in multidimensional NMR experiments that indicate that stable, non-local amino acid interactions are absent for polypeptides in a random-coil conformation. Likewise, in the images produced by crystallography experiments, segments of random coil result simply in a reduction in "electron density" or contrast. A randomly coiled state for any polypeptide chain can be attained by denaturing the system. However, there is evidence that proteins are never truly random coils, even when denatured (Shortle & Ackerman).

== See also ==
- Protein folding
- Native state
- Molten globule
- Probability theory
