= Victor Muñoz (biochemist) =

Spanish biochemist

Victor Muñoz is a biochemist whose focus has been on protein folding and design. He provided experimental evidence for a mechanism of protein folding called as "downhill folding". He has pioneered various computational and experimental techniques to study this mechanism as well as to gain insights into the general process of protein folding.

Prof. Muñoz has used different standard biophysical techniques, such as Nuclear Magnetic Resonance (NMR), to unravel the downhill folding mechanism at an atom-by-atom level, using ultrafast laser temperature jump (T-jump) experiments for studying the kinetics of very fast folding proteins (microsecond timescales), driving Fluorescence Spectroscopy techniques (FRET) at single molecule level to study processes with fast dynamics as well as developing various computational models for quantitative analysis of a multitude of protein folding experimental data from various equilibrium and kinetics experiments. He has also been involved in design and engineering of proteins towards desired properties and functionalities. He has coordinated a consortium of researchers from Spain, "PRODESTECH", for tailoring enzymes, therapeutics and synthetic macromolecular devices from designed proteins.

Dr. Muñoz has been a member of the faculty of the Department of Chemistry & Biochemistry at the University of Maryland since 2000 and has won the Searle Scholar Award, and the David and Lucille Packard Fellowship for Science and Engineering. He moved back to Spain in 2007 as a professor at the Center for Biological Investigations (CIB) of the Spanish Research Council (CSIC) at Madrid. He was elected to the European Molecular Biology Organization in 2009.
