= Dynactin associated protein =

Protein-coding gene in the species Homo sapiens

DYNAP

Identifiers
- Aliases: DYNAP, C18orf26, dynactin associated protein
- External IDs: HomoloGene: 82347; GeneCards: DYNAP; OMA:DYNAP - orthologs

Gene location (Human)
Chr.	Chromosome 18 (human)
Band	18q21.2	Start	54,587,757 bp
Band	18q21.2	End	54,599,493 bp
RNA expression pattern
Bgee	Human / Mouse (ortholog); Top expressed in: gonad; spleen; smooth muscle tissue; left uterine tube; tonsil; right lobe of liver; cervix; right ovary; blood; ectocervix / n/a; More reference expression data
BioGPS	n/a
Gene ontology
Molecular function	protein binding
Cellular component	integral component of membrane; Golgi membrane; plasma membrane; Golgi apparatus; membrane
Biological process	regulation of apoptotic process; activation of protein kinase B activity; cellular response to ergosterol; positive regulation of cell population proliferation
Sources:Amigo / QuickGO
Orthologs
Species	Human	Mouse
Entrez	284254	n/a
Ensembl	ENSG00000178690	n/a
UniProt	Q8N1N2	n/a
RefSeq (mRNA)	NM_001307955; NM_173629	n/a
RefSeq (protein)	NP_001294884; NP_775900	n/a
Location (UCSC)	Chr 18: 54.59 – 54.6 Mb	n/a
PubMed search		n/a
- Wikidata
View/Edit Human

Dynactin associated protein is a protein that in humans is encoded by the DYNAP gene.
