= Denaturation (biochemistry) =

Loss of structure in proteins and nucleic acids due to external stress

IUPAC definition

Process of partial or total alteration of the native secondary, and/or tertiary, and/or quaternary structures of proteins or nucleic acids resulting in a loss of bioactivity.

Note 1: Modified from the definition given in ref.

Note 2: Denaturation can occur when proteins and nucleic acids are subjected to elevated temperature or to extremes of pH, or to nonphysiological concentrations of salt, organic solvents, urea, or other chemical agents.

Note 3: An enzyme loses its ability to alter or speed up a chemical reaction when it is denaturized.

In biochemistry, denaturation is a process in which proteins or nucleic acids lose the folded structure present in their native state due to various factors, including application of some external stress or compound, such as a strong acid or base, a concentrated inorganic salt, an organic solvent (e.g., alcohol or chloroform), agitation, radiation, or heat. If proteins in a living cell are denatured, this results in disruption of cell activity and possibly cell death. Protein denaturation is also a consequence of cell death. Denatured proteins can exhibit a wide range of characteristics, from conformational change and loss of solubility or dissociation of cofactors to aggregation due to the exposure of hydrophobic groups. The loss of solubility as a result of denaturation is called coagulation. When denatured, proteins, e.g., metalloenzymes, lose their 3D structure or metal cofactor and, therefore, cannot function.

Proper protein folding is key to whether a globular or membrane protein can do its job correctly; it must be folded into the native shape to function. However, hydrogen bonds and cofactor-protein binding, which play a crucial role in folding, are rather weak, and thus, easily affected by heat, acidity, varying salt concentrations, chelating agents, and other stressors which can denature the protein. This is one reason why cellular homeostasis is physiologically necessary in most life forms.

== Common examples ==
When food is cooked, some of its proteins become denatured. This is why boiled eggs become hard and cooked meat becomes firm.

A classic example of denaturing in proteins comes from egg whites, which are typically largely egg albumins in water. Fresh from the eggs, egg whites are transparent and liquid. Cooking the thermally unstable whites turns them opaque, forming an interconnected solid mass. The same transformation can be effected with a denaturing chemical. Pouring egg whites into a beaker of acetone will also turn egg whites translucent and solid. The skin that forms on curdled milk is another common example of denatured protein. The cold appetizer known as ceviche is prepared by chemically "cooking" raw fish and shellfish in an acidic citrus marinade, without heat.

== Protein denaturation ==
Denatured proteins can exhibit a wide range of characteristics, from loss of solubility to protein aggregation.

Process of denaturation: 1. Functional protein showing a quaternary structure; 2. When heat is applied it alters the intramolecular bonds of the protein; 3. Unfolding of the polypeptides (amino acids)

=== Background ===
Proteins or polypeptides are polymers of amino acids. A protein is created by ribosomes that "read" RNA that is encoded by codons in the gene and assemble the requisite amino acid combination from the genetic instruction, in a process known as translation. The newly created protein strand then undergoes posttranslational modification, in which additional atoms or molecules are added, for example copper, zinc, or iron. Once this post-translational modification process has been completed, the protein begins to fold (sometimes spontaneously and sometimes with enzymatic assistance), curling up on itself so that hydrophobic elements of the protein are buried deep inside the structure and hydrophilic elements end up on the outside. The final shape of a protein determines how it interacts with its environment.

Protein folding consists of a balance between a substantial amount of weak intra-molecular interactions within a protein (Hydrophobic, electrostatic, and Van Der Waals Interactions) and protein-solvent interactions. As a result, this process is heavily reliant on environmental state that the protein resides in. These environmental conditions include, and are not limited to, temperature, salinity, pressure, and the solvents that happen to be involved. Consequently, any exposure to extreme stresses (e.g. heat or radiation, high inorganic salt concentrations, strong acids and bases) can disrupt a protein's interaction and inevitably lead to denaturation.

When a protein is denatured, secondary and tertiary structures are altered but the peptide bonds of the primary structure between the amino acids are left intact. Since all structural levels of the protein determine its function, the protein can no longer perform its function once it has been denatured. This is in contrast to intrinsically unstructured proteins, which are unfolded in their native state, but still functionally active and tend to fold upon binding to their biological target.

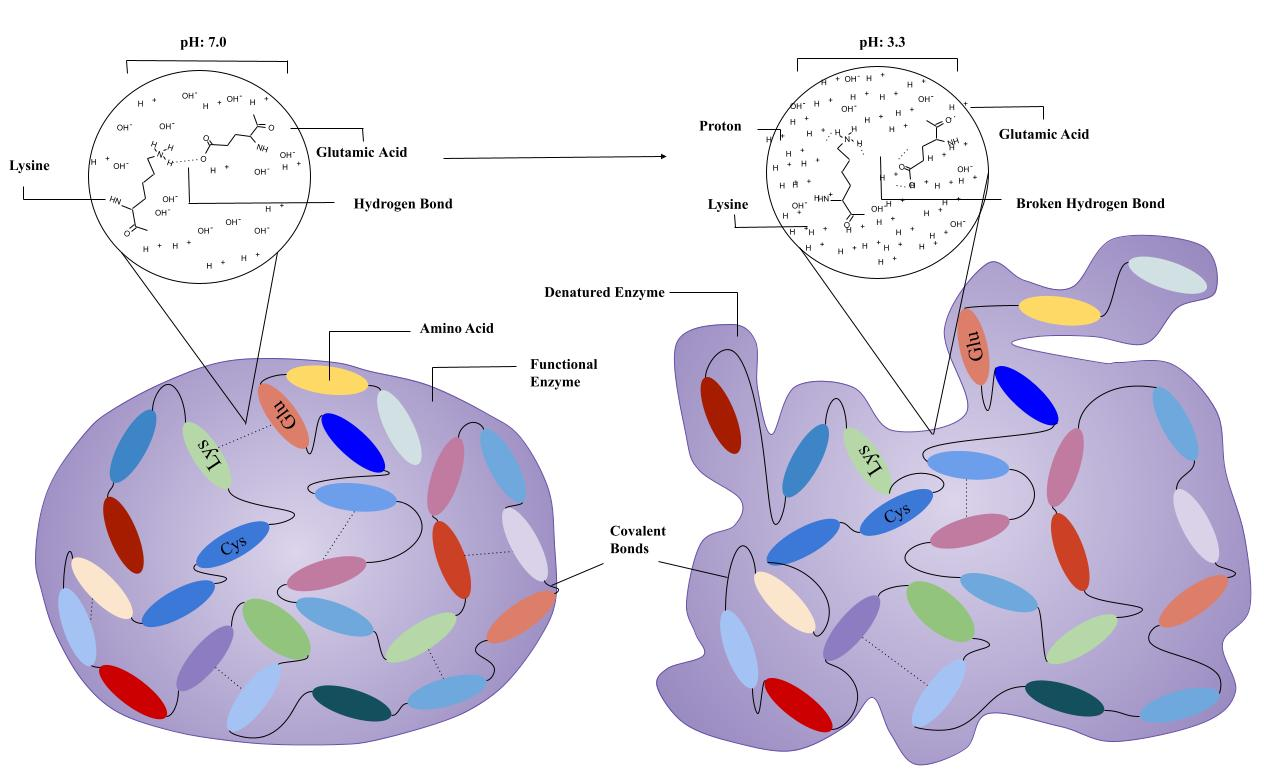
Shifts in normal pH range result in denaturation of enzymes. Decreasing the pH results in interactions between protons and amino acids, resulting in the breakage of existing hydrogen bonds.

=== How denaturation occurs at levels of protein structure ===
- In quaternary structure denaturation, protein sub-units are dissociated and/or the spatial arrangement of protein subunits is disrupted.
- Tertiary structure denaturation involves the disruption of:
  - Covalent interactions between amino acid side-chains (such as disulfide bridges between cysteine groups)
  - Non-covalent dipole-dipole interactions between polar amino acid side-chains (and the surrounding solvent)
  - Van der Waals (induced dipole) interactions between nonpolar amino acid side-chains.
- In secondary structure denaturation, proteins lose all regular repeating patterns such as alpha-helices and beta-pleated sheets, and adopt a random coil configuration.
- Primary structure, such as the sequence of amino acids held together by covalent peptide bonds, is not disrupted by denaturation.

==== Loss of function ====
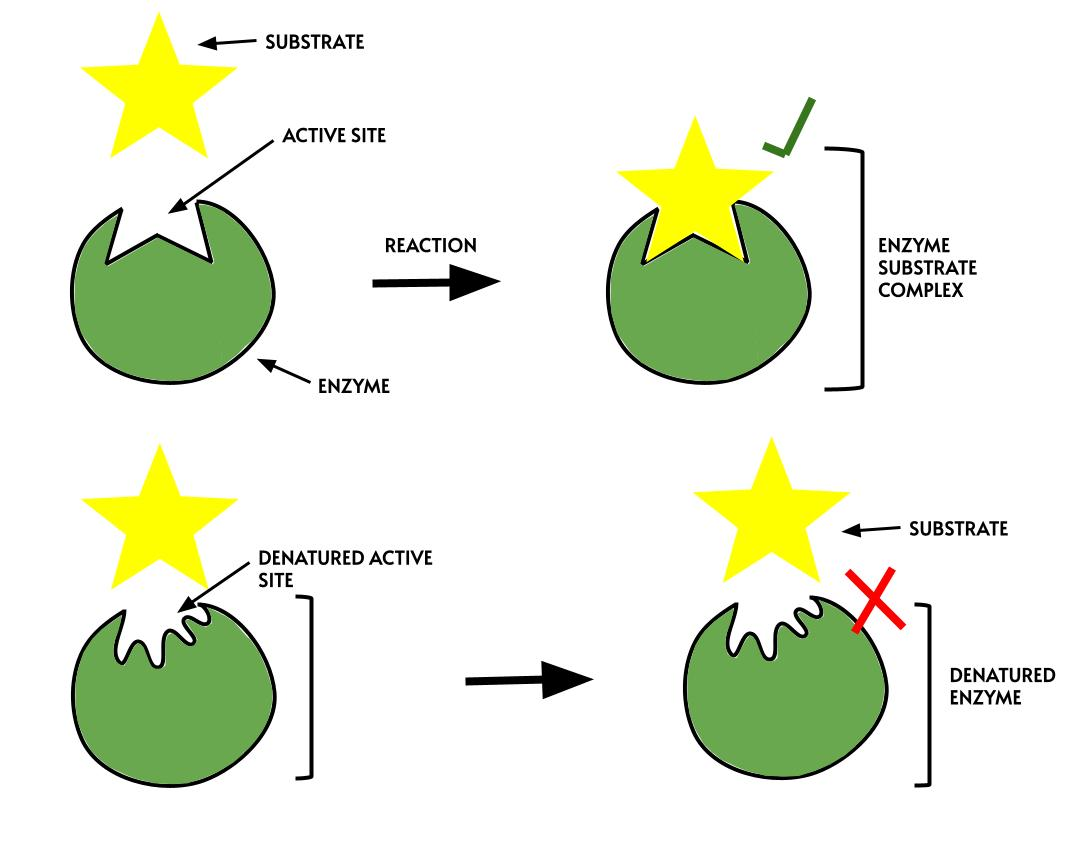
In a normal reaction, the substrate is able to bind to the active site to create the enzyme substrate complex, ultimately catalyzing a reaction. A denatured enzyme changes the shape of the active site, which prevents the substrate from binding to the enzyme active site. The enzyme is unable to perform its function, therefore loss of function.

Most biological substrates lose their biological function when denatured. For example, enzymes lose their activity, because the substrates can no longer bind to the active site, and because amino acid residues involved in stabilizing substrates' transition states are no longer positioned to be able to do so. The denaturing process and the associated loss of activity can be measured using techniques such as dual-polarization interferometry, CD, QCM-D and MP-SPR.

==== Loss of activity due to heavy metals and metalloids ====
By targeting proteins, heavy metals have been known to disrupt the function and activity carried out by proteins. Heavy metals fall into categories consisting of transition metals as well as a select amount of metalloid. These metals, when interacting with native, folded proteins, tend to play a role in obstructing their biological activity. This interference can be carried out in a different number of ways. These heavy metals can form a complex with the functional side chain groups present in a protein or form bonds to free thiols. Heavy metals also play a role in oxidizing amino acid side chains present in protein. Along with this, when interacting with metalloproteins, heavy metals can dislocate and replace key metal ions. As a result, heavy metals can interfere with folded proteins, which can strongly deter protein stability and activity.

==== Reversibility and irreversibility ====
In many cases, denaturation is reversible (the proteins can regain their native state when the denaturing influence is removed). This process can be called renaturation. This understanding has led to the notion that all the information needed for proteins to assume their native state was encoded in the primary structure of the protein, and hence in the DNA that codes for the protein, the so-called "Anfinsen's thermodynamic hypothesis".

Denaturation can also be irreversible. This irreversibility is typically a kinetic, not thermodynamic irreversibility, as a folded protein generally has lower free energy than when it is unfolded. Through kinetic irreversibility, the fact that the protein is stuck in a local minimum can stop it from ever refolding after it has been irreversibly denatured.

==== Protein denaturation due to pH ====
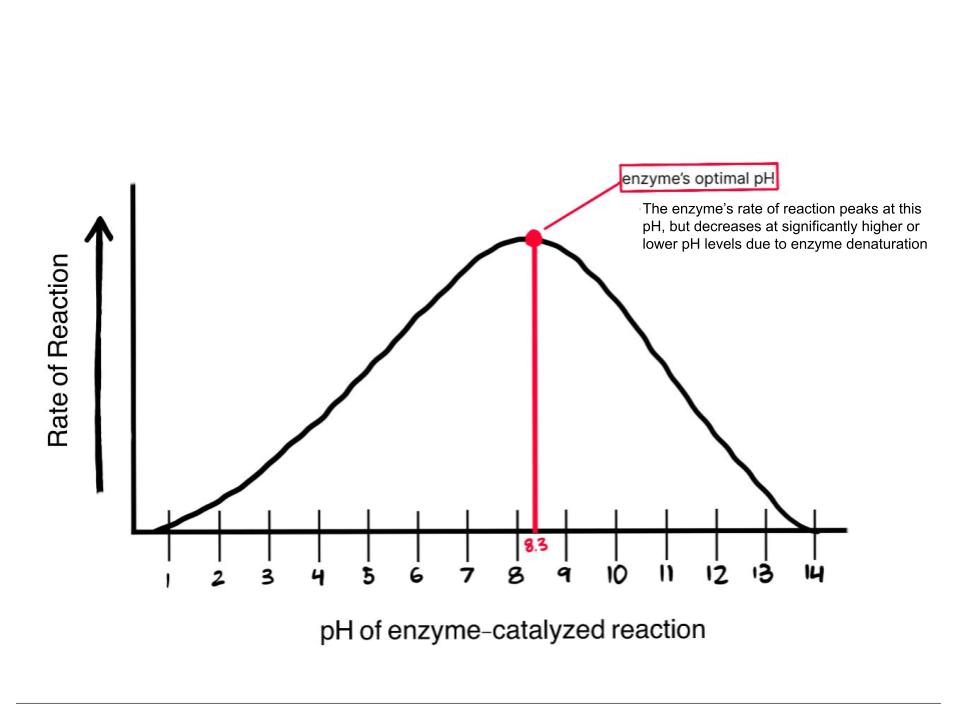
The enzyme depicted has an optimal pH of 8.3, so its reaction rate is the highest at this pH. Significantly increasing or decreasing this reaction's pH can cause this enzyme to denature and, subsequently, decrease the reaction rate.

Denaturation can also be caused by changes in the pH which can affect the chemistry of the amino acids and their residues. The ionizable groups in amino acids are able to become ionized when changes in pH occur. A pH change to more acidic or more basic conditions can induce unfolding. Acid-induced unfolding often occurs between pH 2 and 5, base-induced unfolding usually requires pH 10 or higher.

== Consequences ==
=== Loss of solubility ===
When proteins are folded, they fold so as to keep their hydrophobic parts on the inside (away from water) and their hydrophilic parts on the outside (contacting the water). This makes them soluble enough not to precipitate. However, when denatured the surface of the protein is partly hydrophobic and partly hydrophilic (as it no longer has an "inside" in which to hide the hydrophobic parts), causing it to become insoluble in water. The hydrophobic parts of the denatured proteins stick together, forming a network (gel): this is called coagulation.

The coagulation of denatured proteins is the reason eggs solidify when cooked. When acid is added to milk, the protein casein denatures and coagulates (with fat and water inclusions from the milk) into curds, the first step in making cheese; although milk can also be made to curdle (i.e. casein to coagulate) by other methods, for example the addition of enzymes like chymosin.

== Nucleic acid denaturation ==
Nucleic acids (including RNA and DNA) are nucleotide polymers synthesized by polymerase enzymes during either transcription or DNA replication. Following 5'-3' synthesis of the backbone, individual nitrogenous bases are capable of interacting with one another via hydrogen bonding, thus allowing for the formation of higher-order structures. Nucleic acid denaturation occurs when hydrogen bonding between nucleotides is disrupted, and results in the separation of previously annealed strands. For example, denaturation of DNA due to high temperatures results in the disruption of base pairs and the separation of the double stranded helix into two single strands. Nucleic acid strands are capable of re-annealling when "normal" conditions are restored, but if restoration occurs too quickly, the nucleic acid strands may re-anneal imperfectly resulting in the improper pairing of bases.

=== Biologically-induced denaturation ===
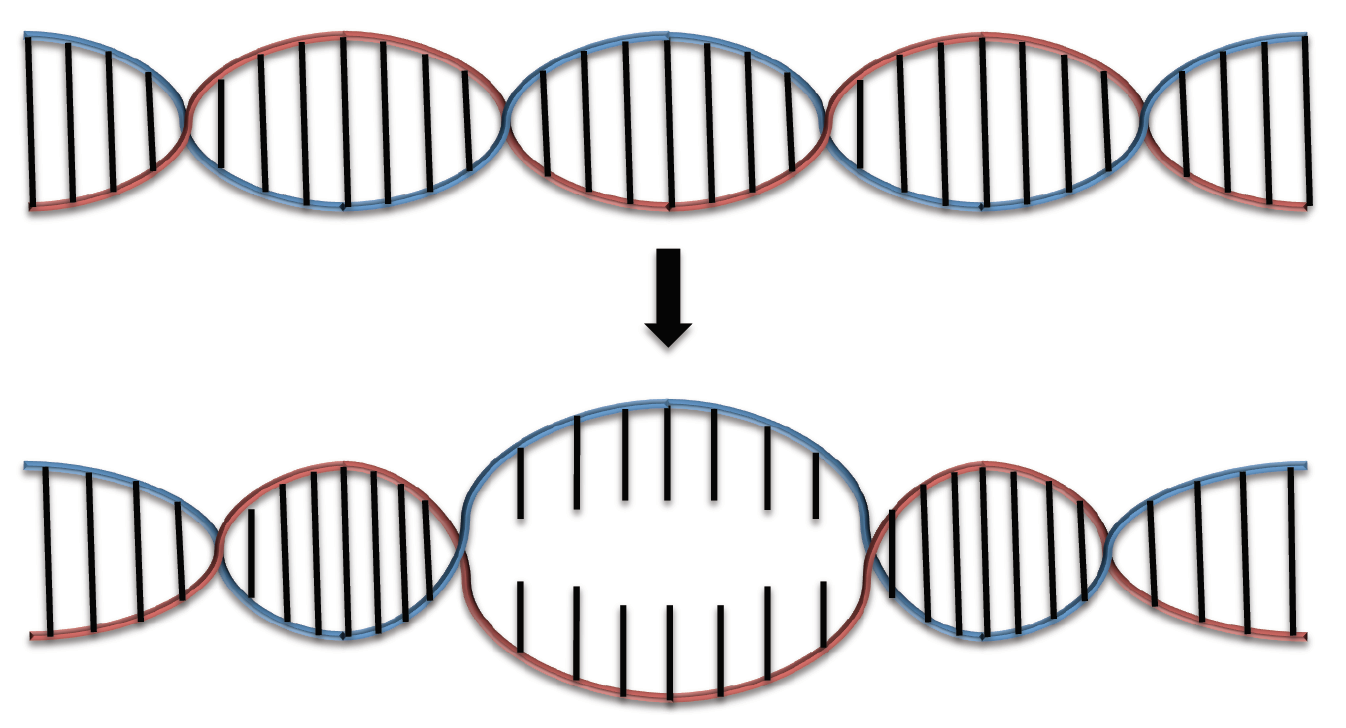
DNA denaturation occurs when hydrogen bonds between base pairs are disturbed.

The non-covalent interactions between antiparallel strands in DNA can be broken in order to "open" the double helix when biologically important mechanisms such as DNA replication, transcription, DNA repair or protein binding are set to occur. The area of partially separated DNA is known as the denaturation bubble, which can be more specifically defined as the opening of a DNA double helix through the coordinated separation of base pairs.

The first model that attempted to describe the thermodynamics of the denaturation bubble was introduced in 1966 and called the Poland-Scheraga Model. This model describes the denaturation of DNA strands as a function of temperature. As the temperature increases, the hydrogen bonds between the base pairs are increasingly disturbed and "denatured loops" begin to form. However, the Poland-Scheraga Model is now considered elementary because it fails to account for the confounding implications of DNA sequence, chemical composition, stiffness and torsion.

Recent thermodynamic studies have inferred that the lifetime of a singular denaturation bubble ranges from 1 microsecond to 1 millisecond. This information is based on established timescales of DNA replication and transcription. Currently, biophysical and biochemical research studies are being performed to more fully elucidate the thermodynamic details of the denaturation bubble.

=== Denaturation due to chemical agents ===
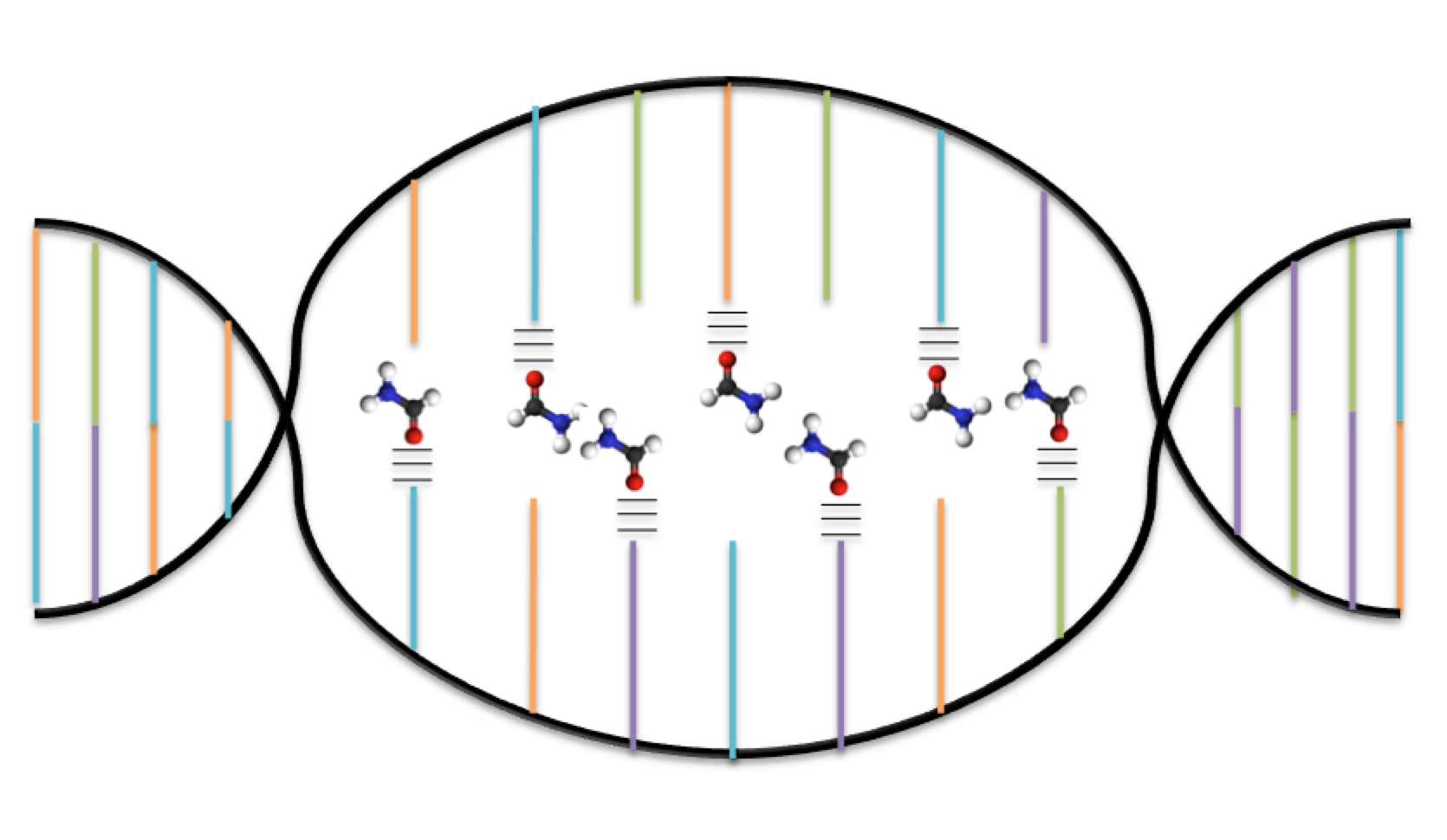
Formamide denatures DNA by disrupting the hydrogen bonds between base pairs. Orange, blue, green, and purple lines represent adenine, thymine, guanine, and cytosine respectively. The three short black lines between the bases and the formamide molecules represent newly formed hydrogen bonds.

With polymerase chain reaction (PCR) being among the most popular contexts in which DNA denaturation is desired, heating is the most frequent method of denaturation. Other than denaturation by heat, nucleic acids can undergo the denaturation process through various chemical agents such as formamide, guanidine, sodium salicylate, dimethyl sulfoxide (DMSO), propylene glycol, and urea. These chemical denaturing agents lower the melting temperature (T_{m}) by competing for hydrogen bond donors and acceptors with pre-existing nitrogenous base pairs. Some agents are even able to induce denaturation at room temperature. For example, alkaline agents (e.g. NaOH) have been shown to denature DNA by changing pH and removing hydrogen-bond contributing protons. These denaturants have been employed to make Denaturing Gradient Gel Electrophoresis gel (DGGE), which promotes denaturation of nucleic acids in order to eliminate the influence of nucleic acid shape on their electrophoretic mobility.

==== Chemical denaturation as an alternative ====
The optical activity (absorption and scattering of light) and hydrodynamic properties (translational diffusion, sedimentation coefficients, and rotational correlation times) of formamide denatured nucleic acids are similar to those of heat-denatured nucleic acids. Therefore, depending on the desired effect, chemically denaturing DNA can provide a gentler procedure for denaturing nucleic acids than denaturation induced by heat. Studies comparing different denaturation methods such as heating, beads mill of different bead sizes, probe sonication, and chemical denaturation show that chemical denaturation can provide quicker denaturation compared to the other physical denaturation methods described. Particularly in cases where rapid renaturation is desired, chemical denaturation agents can provide an ideal alternative to heating. For example, DNA strands denatured with alkaline agents such as NaOH renature as soon as phosphate buffer is added.

==== Denaturation due to air ====
Small, electronegative molecules such as nitrogen and oxygen, which are the primary gases in air, significantly impact the ability of surrounding molecules to participate in hydrogen bonding. These molecules compete with surrounding hydrogen bond acceptors for hydrogen bond donors, therefore acting as "hydrogen bond breakers" and weakening interactions between surrounding molecules in the environment. Antiparellel strands in DNA double helices are non-covalently bound by hydrogen bonding between base pairs; nitrogen and oxygen therefore maintain the potential to weaken the integrity of DNA when exposed to air. As a result, DNA strands exposed to air require less force to separate and exemplify lower melting temperatures.

=== Applications ===
Many laboratory techniques rely on the ability of nucleic acid strands to separate. By understanding the properties of nucleic acid denaturation, the following methods were created:

- PCR
- Southern blot
- Northern blot
- DNA sequencing

== Denaturants ==
=== Protein denaturants ===
==== Acids ====
Acidic protein denaturants include:

- Acetic acid
- Trichloroacetic acid 12% in water
- Sulfosalicylic acid

==== Bases ====
Bases work similarly to acids in denaturation. They include:

- Sodium bicarbonate

==== Solvents ====
Most organic solvents are denaturing, including:

- Ethanol

==== Cross-linking reagents ====
Cross-linking agents for proteins include:

- Formaldehyde
- Glutaraldehyde

==== Chaotropic agents ====
Chaotropic agents include:

- Urea 6–8 mol/L
- Guanidinium chloride 6 mol/L
- Lithium perchlorate 4.5 mol/L
- Sodium dodecyl sulfate

==== Disulfide bond reducers ====
Agents that break disulfide bonds by reduction include:

- 2-Mercaptoethanol
- Dithiothreitol
- TCEP (tris(2-carboxyethyl)phosphine)

==== Chemically reactive agents ====
Agents such as hydrogen peroxide, elemental chlorine, hypochlorous acid (chlorine water), bromine, bromine water, iodine, nitric and oxidising acids, and ozone react with sensitive moieties such as sulfide/thiol, activated aromatic rings (phenylalanine) in effect damage the protein and render it useless.

==== Other ====
- Mechanical agitation
- Picric acid
- Radiation
- Temperature
- Joule heating

=== Nucleic acid denaturants ===
==== Chemical ====
Acidic nucleic acid denaturants include:

- Acetic acid
- HCl
- Nitric acid

Basic nucleic acid denaturants include:

- NaOH

Other nucleic acid denaturants include:

- DMSO
- Formamide
- Guanidine
- Sodium salicylate
- Propylene glycol
- Urea

==== Physical ====
- Thermal denaturation
- Beads mill
- Probe sonication
- Radiation

== See also ==
- Denatured alcohol
- Equilibrium unfolding
- Fixation (histology)
- Molten globule
- Protein folding
- Random coil
