= Molten globule =

Partially-folded protein state

In molecular biology, the term molten globule (MG) refers to protein states that are more or less compact (hence the "globule"), but are lacking the specific tight packing of amino acid residues which creates the solid state-like tertiary structure of completely folded proteins (hence the "molten").

Protein folding is navigated by a dynamic interplay of secondary and tertiary interactions. Two extreme folding pathway models have been formulated. In the first - the framework model - rapidly formed secondary structure elements assemble into a native tertiary structure. In the second - the hydrophobic collapse model - the formation of a loosely packed tertiary structure precedes secondary structure acquisition. A nucleation-condensation mechanism involving concomitant formation of short and long-range interactions combines features of both extreme models and thereby represents a unifying mechanism of protein folding.

During folding, proteins span a continuum of conformers starting from the denature and ending at the native state. Although often considered a statistical random coil, the denatured state can retain residual structure that mediates (re)folding. For instance, staphylococcal nuclease retains native-like topology in 8M urea, while nonnative lysozyme contains hydrophobic clusters held together by long-range interactions. By rapidly adjusting experimental conditions to favor native structure formation, relatively compact protein folding intermediates have been observed. These kinetic intermediates - coined molten globules - exhibit native-like secondary structure and fluctuating tertiary structure.

The molten globule state can also be thermodynamically accessed under mildly denaturing conditions. It was found, for example, in cytochrome c, which conserves a native-like secondary structure content but without the tightly packed protein interior, under low pH and high salt concentration. For cytochrome c and some other proteins, it has been shown that the molten globule state is a "thermodynamic state" clearly different both from the native and the denatured state, demonstrating for the first time the existence of a third equilibrium (i.e., intermediate) state.

The term "molten globule" may be used to describe various types of partially-folded protein states found in slightly denaturing conditions such as low pH (generally pH = 2), mild denaturant, or high temperature. Molten globules are collapsed and generally have some native-like secondary structure but a dynamic tertiary structure as seen by far-UV and near-UV circular dichroism (CD) spectroscopy, respectively. These traits are similar to those observed in the transient intermediate states found during the folding of certain proteins, especially globular proteins that undergo hydrophobic collapse, and therefore the term "molten globule" is also used to refer to certain protein folding intermediates corresponding to the narrowing region of the folding funnel higher in energy than the native state but lower than the denatured state. The molten globule ensembles sampled during protein folding and unfolding are thought to be roughly similar.

The MG structure is believed to lack the close packing of amino acid side chains that characterize the native state ($\ce{N}$) of a protein. The transition from a denatured ($\ce{U}$) state to a molten globule may be a two state process

$$\ce{U <-> MG}$$

Or it may be a continuous transition, with no cooperativity and no apparent "switch" from one form to the other. The folding of some proteins can be modeled as a three-state kinetic process:

$$\ce{U <-> MG <-> N}$$

One of the difficulties in de novo protein design is achieving the side chain packing needed to create a stable native state rather than an ensemble of molten globules. Given a desired backbone conformation, side chain packing can be designed using variations of the dead-end elimination algorithm; however, attempts to design proteins of novel folds have difficulty using this method due to an absence of plausible backbone models.

== See also ==
- Intrinsically disordered proteins
- Folding funnel
- Fuzzy complex
- Hydrophobic collapse
- Biomolecular condensate
