= Anfinsen's dogma =

Molecular biology hypothesis

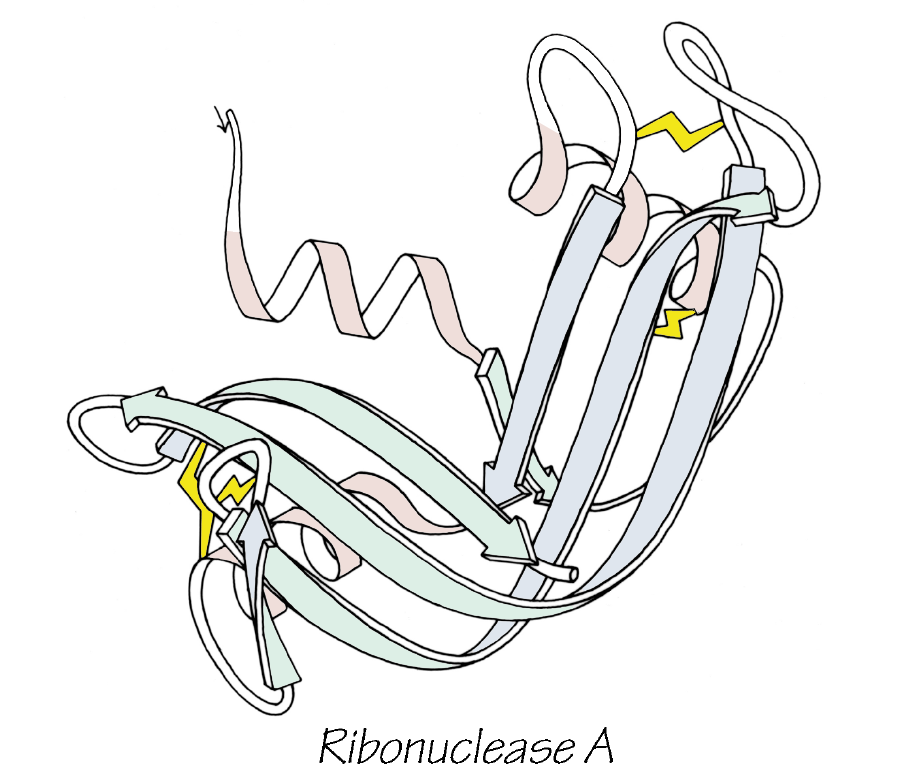
Folded, 3-D structure of ribonuclease A

Anfinsen's dogma, also known as the thermodynamic hypothesis, is a postulate in molecular biology. It states that, at least for a small globular protein in its standard physiological environment, the native structure is determined only by the protein's amino acid sequence. The dogma was championed by the Nobel Prize Laureate Christian B. Anfinsen from his research on the folding of ribonuclease A. His research was based on previous studies by biochemist Lisa Steiner, whose superiors at the time did not recognize the significance. The postulate amounts to saying that, at the environmental conditions (temperature, solvent concentration and composition, etc.) at which folding occurs, the native structure is a unique, stable and kinetically accessible minimum of the free energy. In other words, there are three conditions for formation of a unique protein structure:

- Uniqueness – Requires that the sequence does not have any other configuration with a comparable free energy. Hence the free energy minimum must be unchallenged.
- Stability – Small changes in the surrounding environment cannot give rise to changes in the minimum configuration. This can be pictured as a free energy surface that looks more like a funnel (with the native state in the bottom of it) rather than like a soup plate (with several closely related low-energy states); the free energy surface around the native state must be rather steep and high, in order to provide stability.
- Kinetical accessibility – Means that the path in the free energy surface from the unfolded to the folded state must be reasonably smooth or, in other words, that the folding of the chain must not involve highly complex changes in the shape (like knots or other high order conformations). Basic changes in the shape of the protein happen dependent on their environment, shifting shape to suit their place. This creates multiple configurations for biomolecules to shift into.

== Challenges to Anfinsen's dogma ==
Protein folding in a cell is a highly complex process that involves transport of the newly synthesized proteins to appropriate cellular compartments through targeting, permanent misfolding, temporarily unfolded states, post-translational modifications, quality control, and formation of protein complexes facilitated by chaperones.

Some proteins need the assistance of chaperone proteins to fold properly. It has been suggested that this disproves Anfinsen's dogma. However, the chaperones do not appear to affect the final state of the protein; they seem to work primarily by preventing aggregation of several protein molecules prior to the final folded state of the protein. However, at least some chaperones are required for the proper folding of their subject proteins.

Many proteins can also undergo aggregation and misfolding. For example, prions are stable conformations of proteins which differ from the native folding state. In bovine spongiform encephalopathy, native proteins re-fold into a different stable conformation, which causes fatal amyloid buildup. Other amyloid diseases, including Alzheimer's disease and Parkinson's disease, are also exceptions to Anfinsen's dogma.

Some proteins have multiple native structures, and change their fold based on some external factors. For example, the KaiB protein as part of the KaiABC complex switches fold throughout the day, acting as a circadian clock for cyanobacteria. It has been estimated that around 0.5–4% of Protein Data Bank (PDB) proteins are metamorphic. The switching between alternative structures is driven by interactions of the protein with small ligands or other proteins, by chemical modifications (such as phosphorylation) or by changed environmental conditions, such as temperature, pH or membrane potential. Each alternative structure may either correspond to the global minimum of free energy of the protein at the given conditions or be kinetically trapped in a higher local minimum of free energy.
