= Native state =

Proper form of a protein or nucleic acid

In biochemistry, the native state of a protein or nucleic acid is its properly folded and/or assembled form, which is operative and functional. The native state of a biomolecule may possess all four levels of biomolecular structure, with the secondary through quaternary structure being formed from weak interactions along the covalently-bonded backbone. This is in contrast to the denatured state, in which these weak interactions are disrupted, leading to the loss of these forms of structure and retaining only the biomolecule's primary structure.

== Biochemistry ==
=== Proteins ===
While all protein molecules begin as simple unbranched chains of amino acids, once completed they assume highly specific three-dimensional shapes. That ultimate shape, known as tertiary structure, is the folded shape that possesses a minimum of free energy. It is a protein's tertiary, folded structure that makes it capable of performing its biological function. In fact, shape changes in proteins are the primary cause of several neurodegenerative diseases, including those caused by prions and amyloid (i.e. mad cow disease, kuru, Creutzfeldt–Jakob disease).

Many enzymes and other non-structural proteins have more than one native state, and they operate or undergo regulation by transitioning between these states. However, "native state" is used almost exclusively in the singular, typically to distinguish properly folded proteins from denatured or unfolded ones. In other contexts, the folded shape of a protein is most often referred to as its native "conformation" or "structure."

Folded and unfolded proteins are often easily distinguished by virtue of their water solubilities, as many proteins become insoluble on denaturation. Proteins in the native state will have defined secondary structure, which can be detected spectroscopically, by circular dichroism and by nuclear magnetic resonance (NMR).

The native state of a protein can be distinguished from a molten globule, by among other things, distances measured by NMR. Amino acids widely separated in a protein's sequence may touch or lie very close to one another within a stably folded protein. In a molten globule, on the other hand, their time-averaged distances are liable to be greater.

Learning how native state proteins can be manufactured is important, as attempts to create proteins from scratch have resulted in molten globules and not true native state products. Therefore, an understanding of the native state is crucial in protein engineering.

=== Nucleic acids ===
Nucleic acids attain their native state through base pairing and, to a lesser extent, other interactions such as coaxial stacking. Biological DNA usually exists as long linear double helices bound to proteins in chromatin, and biological RNA such as tRNA often form complex native configurations approaching the complexity of folded proteins. Additionally, artificial nucleic acid structures used in DNA nanotechnology are designed to have specific native configurations in which multiple nucleic acid strands are assembled into a single complex. In some cases native state of biological DNA performs their functions without being controlled by any other regulatory units.
