= List of protein structure prediction software =

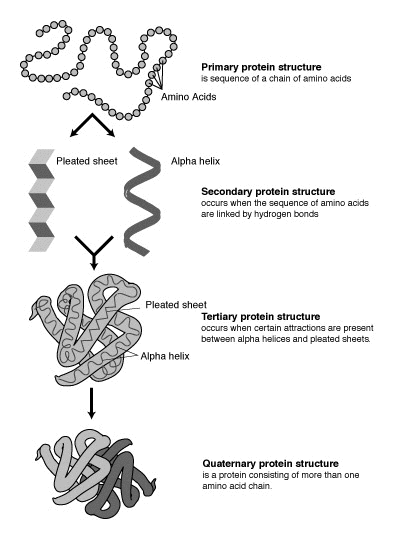
Constituent amino-acids can be analyzed to predict secondary, tertiary and quaternary protein structure.

This list of protein structure prediction software summarizes notable used software tools in protein structure prediction, including homology modeling, protein threading, ab initio methods, secondary structure prediction, and transmembrane helix and signal peptide prediction.

== Software list ==
Below is a list which separates programs according to the method used for structure prediction.

=== Homology modeling ===
Name	Method	Description	Release date	Reference
IntFOLD	A unified interface for: Tertiary structure prediction/3D modelling, 3D model quality assessment, Intrinsic disorder prediction, Domain prediction, Prediction of protein-ligand binding residues	Automated webserver and some downloadable programs	2011	Roche & McGuffin, 2011
RaptorX	remote homology detection, protein 3D modeling, binding site prediction	Automated webserver and Downloadable program	2011	Peng & Xu, 2011
Biskit	wraps external programs into automated workflow	BLAST search, T-Coffee alignment, and MODELLER construction	2007	Grünberg et al., 2007
ESyPred3D	Template detection, alignment, 3D modeling	Automated webserver	2002	Lambert et al., 2002
FoldX	Energy calculations and protein design	Downloadable program	2005	Schymkowitz et al., 2005
Phyre, Phyre2	Remote template detection, alignment, 3D modeling, multi-templates, ab initio	Webserver with job manager, automatically updated fold library, genome searching and other facilities	2009	Kelley & Sternberg, 2009
HHpred	Template detection, alignment, 3D modeling	Interactive webserver with help facility	2005	Söding et al., 2005
MODELLER	Satisfaction of spatial restraints	Standalone program mainly in Fortran and Python	1993	Šali & Blundell, 1993
CONFOLD	Satisfaction of contact and distance restraints	Standalone program mainly in Fortran and Perl	2015	Adhikari et al., 2015
Molecular Operating Environment (MOE)	Template identification, use of multiple templates and accounting for other environments (e.g. excluded ligand volumes), loop modelling, rotamer libraries for sidechain conformations, relaxation using MM forcefields.	Proprietary platform, supported on Windows, Linux and Mac	1994	Chemical Computing Group; MOE documentation
Robetta	Rosetta homology modeling and ab initio fragment assembly with Ginzu domain prediction	Webserver	2004	Kim et al., 2004
BHAGEERATH-H	Combination of ab initio folding and homology methods	Protein tertiary structure predictions	2014	Jayaram et al., 2014
Swiss-model	Local similarity/fragment assembly	Automated webserver (based on ProModII)	1993	Peitsch et al.; SWISS-MODEL documentation
Yasara	Detection of templates, alignment, modeling incl. ligands and oligomers, hybridization of model fragments	Graphical interface or text mode (clusters)	2003	YASARA development history/documentation
AWSEM-Suite	Molecular dynamics simulation based on template-guided, coevolutionary-enhanced optimized folding landscapes	Automated webserver	2020	Jin et al., 2020
ModPipe	Automated comparative modeling; MODELLER-based	Automated pipeline for large-scale comparative protein structure modeling using sequence–structure relationships and MODELLER-based model generation	2003	Eswar et al., 2003
ModWeb	Automated comparative modeling	Web-based automated comparative-modeling server that uses sequence searches, template selection, alignment and MODELLER for protein structure modeling	2003	Eswar et al.; ModWeb documentation
CPHmodels	Homology modeling / fragment assembly	Automated server for protein homology modeling using template identification, sequence–structure alignment and model construction	2003	Nielsen et al., 2003
3D-JIGSAW	Comparative modeling / rigid-body assembly	Automated protein comparative-modeling server that identifies structural templates and assembles models from conserved structural regions	2001	Bates et al., 2001
M4T	Multiple-template comparative modeling	Comparative-modeling server that combines multiple templates with iterative optimization of alternative target–template alignments	2005	Fernandez-Fuentes et al., 2005
ICM	Template-based comparative modeling	Molecular-modeling platform supporting protein homology modeling, template selection, alignment, loop modeling and structure refinement	1994	Abagyan et al. 2012; comparative modeling evaluations
Prime	Comparative/homology modeling	Protein-structure modeling module using template-based modeling, loop prediction and structural refinement	2006	Comparative modeling evaluation
COMPOSER	Rigid-body comparative modeling	Classical comparative-modeling program that constructs protein models through rigid-body assembly of conserved structural regions	1987	Sutcliffe et al., 1987; comparative-modeling literature
PrISM	Comparative modeling / structural alignment	Protein modeling system that uses structural templates and sequence–structure relationships for comparative model construction.	2000	Yang & Honig; comparative-modeling literature
Geno3D	Homology modeling / segment matching	Web-based protein structure-prediction server that uses comparative modeling and structural template information to construct three-dimensional models.		Combet et al., 2005

=== Threading and fold recognition ===
Name	Method	Description	Release date	Reference
IntFOLD	A unified interface for: Tertiary structure prediction/3D modelling, 3D model quality assessment, Intrinsic disorder prediction, Domain prediction, Prediction of protein-ligand binding residues	Automated webserver and some downloadable programs	2011	Roche et al. (2011)
RaptorX	Remote template detection, single-template and multi-template threading, totally different from and much better than the old program RAPTOR designed by the same group	Webserver with job manager, automatically updated fold library	2011	Peng & Xu (2011)
HHpred	Template detection, alignment, 3D modeling	Interactive webserver with help facility	2005	Söding, Biegert & Lupas (2005)
Phyre, Phyre2	Remote template detection, alignment, 3D modeling, multi-templates, ab initio	Webserver with job manager, automatically updated fold library, genome searching and other facilities	2009	Kelley & Sternberg (2009)
I-TASSER	Threading fragment structure reassembly	On-line server for protein modeling https://zhanggroup.org/I-TASSER/	2008	Zhang (2008)

=== Ab initio structure prediction ===
Name	Method	Description	Release date	Reference
trRosetta	trRosetta is an algorithm for fast and accurate protein structure prediction. It supports single-sequence structure prediction with trRosettaX-Single.	Webserver and source codes available at: https://yanglab.qd.sdu.edu.cn/trRosetta/	2020	Yang et al. (2020)
ROBETTA	Rosetta homology modeling and ab initio fragment assembly with Ginzu domain prediction	Webserver	2004	Kim, Chivian & Baker (2004)
Rosetta@home	Distributed-computing implementation of Rosetta algorithm	Downloadable program	2005	Rosetta Commons timeline; Rosetta@home documentation
Abalone	Molecular Dynamics folding	Program	2006	Abalone software documentation
C-QUARK	C-QUARK is a method for ab initio protein structure prediction. Based on deep-learning based contact-map predictions into the fragment assembly simulations.	Webserver https://zhanggroup.org/C-QUARK/	2021	Zheng et al. (2021)
AlphaFold2	An end-to-end deep learning framework for protein structure prediction	Webserver and downloadable program	2021	Jumper et al. (2021)
D-I-TASSER	The deep learning-based I-TASSER program reportedly outperforms both AlphaFold2 and AlphaFold3	Webserver https://zhanggroup.org/D-I-TASSER/	2023	Zheng et al. (2023)

=== Secondary structure prediction ===
Detailed list of programs can be found at List of protein secondary structure prediction programs

== See also ==
- List of protein secondary structure prediction programs
- Comparison of nucleic acid simulation software
- List of software for molecular mechanics modeling
- Molecular design software
- Protein design
- AlphaFold
