= Biskit =

Biskit science
- Developers: Raik Grünberg, Johan Leckner, and others
- Stable release: 3.0.1 / 18 March 2025; 9 months ago
- Repository: github.com/graik/biskit
- Written in: Python
- Operating system: UNIX, Linux, Mac OS X
- Type: Bioinformatics tool
- License: GPL
- Website: biskit.pasteur.fr

Biskit is an open source software package that facilitates research in structural bioinformatics and molecular modelling. Written in Python, it consists of:

- An object-oriented programming library for manipulating and analyzing macromolecular structures, protein complexes and molecular dynamics trajectories
- A set of programs for solving specific tasks, such as automatic prediction of protein structures by homology modeling, and possible prediction of protein complex structures through flexible protein-protein docking

The library delegates many calculations to more specialized third-party software. It currently utilizes 15 external applications, including X-PLOR, Hex, T-Coffee, DSSP and MODELLER.

The latest Biskit version, 2.4.0, was released on 4 Mar 2012. It was originally developed at the Pasteur Institute. The name "Biskit" refers to the research group's name, Unité de BioInformatique Structurale.
