= Swiss-model =

Suite of services for protein homology modeling

- Type: Structural bioinformatics tool
- License: freeware, source code unavailable
- Website: swissmodel.expasy.org

Swiss-model (stylized as SWISS-MODEL) is a structural bioinformatics web-server dedicated to homology modeling of 3D protein structures. Before AlphaFold, homology modeling was the most accurate method to generate reliable three-dimensional protein structure models. To this day, it is still used in many practical applications where deep learning techniques fall short because of their data-driven approach. Homology (or comparative) modelling methods make use of experimental protein structures (templates) to build models for evolutionary related proteins (targets).

Today, Swiss-model consists of three tightly integrated components: (1) The Swiss-model pipeline – a suite of software tools and databases for automated protein structure modelling, (2) The Swiss-model Workspace – a web-based graphical user interface workbench, (3) The Swiss-model Repository – a continuously updated database of homology models for a set of model organism proteomes of high biomedical interest.

== Pipeline ==
Swiss-model pipeline comprises the four main steps that are involved in building a homology model of a given protein structure:

1. Identify structural template(s). BLAST and HHblits are used to identify templates. Those are stored in the Swiss-model Template Library (SMTL), which is derived from Protein Data Bank (PDB).
2. Align target sequence and template structure(s).
3. Build model and minimize energy. Swiss-model implements a rigid fragment assembly approach in modelling.
4. Assess model quality using QMEAN, a statistical potential of mean force.

== Workspace ==
The Swiss-model Workspace integrates programs and databases required for protein structure prediction and modelling in a web-based workspace. Depending on the complexity of the modelling task, different modes of use can be applied, in which the user has different levels of control over individual modelling steps: automated mode, alignment mode, and project mode. A fully automated mode is used when a sufficiently high sequence identity between target and template (>50%) allows for no human intervention at all. In this case only the sequence or UniProt accession code of the protein is required as input. The alignment mode enables the user to input their own target-template alignments from which the modelling procedure starts (i.e. search for templates step is skipped and rarely only minor changes in the provided alignment are made). The project mode is used in more difficult cases, when manual corrections of target-template alignments are needed to improve the quality of the resulting model. In this mode the input is a project file that can be generated by the DeepView (Swiss Pdb Viewer) visualization and structural analysis tool, to allow the user to examine and manipulate the target-template alignment in its structural context. In all three cases the output is a pdb file with atom coordinates of the model or a DeepView project file. The four main steps of homology modelling may be repeated iteratively until a satisfactory model is achieved.

The Swiss-model Workspace is accessible via the ExPASy web server, or it can be used as part of the program DeepView (Swiss Pdb-Viewer). As of September 2015 it has been cited 20000 times in scientific literature, making it one of the most widely used tools for protein structure modelling. The tool is free for academic use.

== Repository ==
The Swiss-model Repository provides access to an up-to-date collection of annotated three-dimensional protein models for a set of model organisms of high general interest. Model organisms include human, mouse, C.elegans, E.coli, and various pathogens including severe acute respiratory syndrome coronavirus 2 (SARS-CoV-2). Swiss-model Repository is integrated with several external resources, such as UniProt, InterPro, STRING, and Nature Protein Structure Initiative (PSI) SBKB.

New developments of the Swiss-model expert system feature (1) automated modelling of homo-oligomeric assemblies; (2) modelling of essential metal ions and biologically relevant ligands in protein structures; (3) local (per-residue) model reliability estimates based on the QMEAN local score function; (4) mapping of UniProt features to models. (1) and (2) are available when using the automated mode of the Swiss-model Workspace; (3) is always provided when calculating an homology model using the Swiss-model Workspace, and (4) is available in the Swiss-model Repository.

== Accuracy and reliability of the method ==
In the past, the accuracy, stability and reliability of the Swiss-model server pipeline was validated by the EVA-CM benchmark project. As of 2024, the Swiss-model server pipeline is participating in the Continuous Automated Model EvaluatiOn (CAMEO3D) project, which continuously evaluates the accuracy and reliability of protein structure prediction services via fully automated means.

== See also ==
- Homology modelling
- Protein structure prediction
- Protein structure prediction software
- CASP (Critical Assessment of Techniques for Protein Structure Prediction)
