= List of protein secondary structure prediction programs =

List of notable protein secondary structure prediction programs

Name	Method description	Type	Link	Initial release
RaptorX-SS8	predict both 3-state and 8-state secondary structure using conditional neural fields from PSI-BLAST profiles	Webserver/downloadable	server download	2011
GOR	Information theory/Bayesian inference	Many implementations	Basic GOR GOR V	2002 (GOR V)
Jpred	Multiple Neural network assignment from PSI-BLAST and HMMER profiles. Predicts secondary structure and solvent accessibility	Webserver	server and API	1998
PredictProtein	Profile-based neural network	Webserver	server	1992
PSIPRED	two feed-forward neural networks which perform an analysis on output obtained from PSI-BLAST	Webserver	server	1999

== See also ==
- List of protein structure prediction software
- Protein structure prediction
