= ESyPred3D =

ESyPred3D is an automated homology modeling program. Alignments are obtained by combining, weighting and screening the results of several multiple alignment programs. The final three-dimensional structure is built using the modeling package MODELLER.

== Method ==
To perform homology modeling, the ESyPred3D program first searches for a template (a similar sequence of known structure), before aligning the query and template sequences. EsyPred3D then build the 3D models using the alignment and the template structure, before assessing the final 3D model.

The query and the template sequences are aligned using a consensus alignment method. Different multiple sequence alignments are built using different alignment programs on two sets of sequences including the query and the template sequence. The consensus method uses a neural network to find the best aligned residues and analyzing all possible combinations using a dead end elimination algorithm.

The final 3D model is built from the target-template alignment and the 3D structure of the template using MODELLER. MODELLER is also used to build the missing loops.

== See also ==
- List of protein structure prediction software
- Protein structure prediction
- Homology modeling
