= FAM237A =

Protein coding gene

Identifiers
- Aliases: FAM237A, LOC200726, hCG1657980, family with sequence similarity 237 member A
- External IDs: GeneCards: FAM237A

Gene location (Human)
Chr.	Chromosome 2 (human)
Band	2q33.3	Start	206,642,487 bp
Band	2q33.3	End	206,649,365 bp
RNA expression pattern
Bgee	Human / Mouse (ortholog); Top expressed in: testicle; primary visual cortex; nucleus accumbens; caudate nucleus; putamen; apex of heart; superior frontal gyrus; Brodmann area 9; prefrontal cortex; left ventricle / n/a; More reference expression data
BioGPS	n/a
Orthologs
Databases	NCBI: entry; OMA: entry
Species	Human	Mouse
Entrez	200726	n/a
Ensembl	ENSG00000235118	n/a
UniProt	A0A1B0GTK4	n/a
RefSeq (mRNA)	NM_001102659	n/a
RefSeq (protein)	NP_001096129	n/a
Location (UCSC)	Chr 2: 206.64 – 206.65 Mb	n/a
PubMed search		n/a
- Wikidata
View/Edit Human

FAM237A is a protein coding gene which encodes a protein of the same name. Within Homo sapiens, FAM237A is believed to be primarily expressed within the brain, with moderate heart and lesser testes expression. FAM237A is hypothesized to act as a specific activator of receptor GPR83.

== Gene ==
FAM237A is alternatively known as HCG1657980 and LOC200726. Homo sapiens FAM237A's sequence resides on chromosome 2's + strand, and extends from bases 207486904 to 207514174. Homo sapiens FAM237A sequence contains 13 exons unspliced.

== Transcripts ==
Homo sapiens FAM237A is predicted to produce six unique transcripts, of which four are spliced.

Alternate Transcripts of Homo sapiens FAM237A
Name	Size (Base Pairs)	Exon Usage
aAug10	1797	2,3,8,10
bAug10	1376	4,6,13
cAug10	1121	5,12
dAug10 (Unspliced)	798	7
eAug10 (Unspliced)	873	9
fAug10	706	1,11

== Proteins ==
Homo sapiens FAM237A is associated with three unnamed protein isoforms. FAM237A's most-researched isoform is 181 amino acids long, and is predicted to contain a transmembrane domain. FAM237A's second protein isoform is predicted to be 417 amino acids long; it contains a transmembrane domain and an upstream open reading frame. The last protein isoform of FAM237A is made up of 158 amino acids and contains a transmembrane domain; this isoform is predicted to localize within the membrane. Several databases, including NCBI, only recognize FAM237A's 181 amino acid isoform. Given the relative abundance of literature surrounding it, the remainder of this page's findings only discuss FAM237A's 181 amino acid isoform.

The theoretical molecular weight of this isoform is 20.56 kDA. Its theoretical isoelectric point is 8.96. Homo sapiens FAM237A amino acid composition is predicted to be relatively standard. It notably contains a repeat LFWD motif at amino acids 90 and 97.

FAM237A's transmembrane domain is generally predicted to reside on amino acids 14-32 within the protein. However, structure prediction tool Phyre2 predicts that the protein's transmembrane domain resides on amino acids 91–106.

== Regulation ==
Three promoters of Homo sapiens FAM237A are predicted: GXP_8991091, GXP_7539237, and GXP_8991092. Of these, GXP_8991091 has the greatest predicted tissue expression levels.

AceView predicts that Homo sapiens FAM237A is localized to membranes. However, this is disputed, with protein localization prediction resource Hum-mPLoc predicting that Homo sapiens FAM237A is expressed within the nucleus and resource PSORT II predicting ER localization, with lesser chances of expression within the mitochondria and Golgi apparatus.

An abundance of predicted phosphorylation sites reside on Homo sapiens FAM237A's sequence. Homo sapiens FAM237A contains two predicted fatty acid addition sites at amino acids 18 and 26; these sites overlap with one of the FAM237A's predicted transmembrane sequences. Homo sapiens FAM237A is additionally predicted to contain two sites of ubiquitination at amino acids 179 and 181 on its sequence. These ubiquitination sites are predicted to perfectly overlap two acetylation sites.

== Homology ==
Homo sapiens FAM237A has one predicted paralog: FAM237B. FAM237B has 21.6% predicted identity with FAM237A.

FAM237A has orthologs in a broad range of vertebrate organisms, including other mammals, reptiles, ray-finned fish, and birds. The gene is not found in invertebrates. Based upon BLAST analysis, FAM237A is not found in invertebrates. The only reptiles which FAM237A is found in are predicted to be of the suborder Cryptodira, based upon BLAST searches.

== Function ==
Information regarding FAM237A's function is limited; however, FAM237A is predicted to be a specific activator of GPR83, which is implicated in energy metabolism, dietary patterns, and reward signaling. GPR83 is additionally suspected to be correlated to immune system function.
