= ModBase =

Content
- Description: Database of comparative protein structure models

Contact
- Research center: University of California at San Francisco
- Laboratory: Department of Bioengineering and Therapeutic Sciences
- Authors: Ursula Pieper, Eswar Narayanan, Ben Webb, Andrej Sali
- Primary citation: Pieper & al. (2011)
- Release date: 1998

Access
- Website: http://salilab.org/modbase
- Download URL: ftp://salilab.org/databases/modbase
- Web service URL: http://salilab.org/modweb

ModBase is a database of annotated comparative protein structure models, containing models for more than 3.8 million unique protein sequences. Models are created by the comparative modeling pipeline ModPipe which relies on the MODELLER program.

ModBase is developed in the laboratory of Andrej Sali at UCSF. ModBase models are also accessible through the Protein Model Portal.

== See also ==
- Homology modeling
