= MMDB (disambiguation) =

MMDB or Molecular Modeling Database is a database of biomolecular structures.

MMDB may also refer to:

- Multimedia database, a collection of related digital media objects
- Main memory database system or in-memory database, a database management system
