= PSIPRED =

Method used to investigate protein structure

- Original authors: David T. Jones; Daniel Buchan; Tim Nugent; Liam McGuffin; Federico Minneci; Kevin Bryson
- Developers: University College London, Bioinformatics Group
- Release: 1999; 27 years ago
- Stable release: 4.02 / 26 September 2018; 8 years ago
- Written in: C
- Operating system: Windows 2000, Unix
- Platform: x86, Java
- Size: 14 MB
- Available in: English
- Type: Bioinformatics secondary structure prediction
- License: Proprietary freeware source code
- Website: bioinf.cs.ucl.ac.uk/psipred

PSI-blast based secondary structure PREDiction (PSIPRED) is a method used to investigate protein structure. It uses artificial neural network machine learning methods in its algorithm. It is a server-side program, featuring a website serving as a front-end interface, which can predict a protein's secondary structure (beta sheets, alpha helixes and coils) from the primary sequence.

PSIPRED is available as a web service and as software. The software is distributed as source code, licensed technically as proprietary software. It allows modifying, but enforces freeware provisions by forbidding for-profit distribution of the software and its results.

== Secondary structure ==
Secondary structure is the general three-dimensional form of local segments of biopolymers such as proteins and nucleic acids (DNA, RNA). It does not, however, describe specific atomic positions in three-dimensional space, which are considered to be the tertiary structure. Secondary structure can be formally defined by the hydrogen bonds of the biopolymer, as observed in an atomic-resolution structure. In proteins, the secondary structure is defined by the patterns of hydrogen bond between backbone amino and carboxyl groups. Conversely, for nucleic acids, the secondary structure consists of the hydrogen bonding between the nitrogenous bases. The hydrogen bonding patterns may be significantly distorted, which makes automatic determination of secondary structure difficult. Efforts to use computers to predict protein secondary structures, based only on their given primary structure sequences, have been ongoing since the 1970s.

Secondary structure prediction involves a set of methods in bioinformatics that aim to predict the local secondary structures of proteins and RNA sequences based only on knowledge of their primary structure – amino acid or nucleotide sequence, respectively. For proteins, a prediction consists of assigning regions of the amino acid sequence as highly probable alpha helixes, beta strands (often noted as extended conformations), or turns. The success of a prediction is determined by comparing it to the results of the DSSP algorithm applied to the crystal structure of the protein; for nucleic acids, it may be determined from the hydrogen bonding pattern. Specialized algorithms have been developed to detect specific well-defined patterns such as transmembrane helixes and coiled coils in proteins, or canonical micro-RNA structures in RNA.

== Basic information ==
The idea of this method is to use the information of the evolutionarily related proteins to predict the secondary structure of a new amino acid sequence. PSIBLAST is used to find related sequences and to build a position-specific scoring matrix. This matrix is processed by an artificial neural network, which was constructed and trained to predict the secondary structure of the input sequence; in short, it is a machine learning method.

== Prediction algorithm (method) ==
The prediction method or algorithm is split into three stages: generating a sequence profile, predicting initial secondary structure, and filtering the predicted structure. PSIPRED works to normalize the sequence profile generated by PSIBLAST. Then, by using neural networking, initial secondary structure is predicted. For each amino acid in the sequence, the neural network is fed with a window of 15 acids. Added information is attached, indicating if the window spans the N or C terminus of the chain. This results in a final input layer of 315 input units, divided into 15 groups of 21 units. The network has one hidden layer of 75 units and 3 output nodes (one for each secondary structure element: helix, sheet, coil).

A second neural network is used to filter the predicted structure of the first network. This network is also fed with a window of 15 positions. The indicator on the possible position of the window at a chain terminus is also forwarded. This results in 60 input units, divided into 15 groups of four. The network has one hidden layer of 60 units and results in three output nodes (one for each secondary structure element: helix, sheet, coil).

The three final output nodes deliver a score for each secondary structure element for the central position of the window. Using the secondary structure with the highest score, PSIPRED generates the protein prediction. The Q3 value is the fraction of residues predicted correctly in the secondary structure states, namely helix, strand, and coil.

== See also ==
- Jpred
- Protein design
- Protein function prediction
- De novo protein structure prediction
- Molecular design software
- List of protein structure prediction software
- Comparison of software for molecular mechanics modeling
- Modelling biological systems
- Protein fragment library
- Lattice proteins
- Statistical potential
