= IntFOLD =

Structural Bioinformatics

The IntFOLD server
- Developer: Prof Liam McGuffin Dr Recep Adiyaman Dr Bajuna Salehe
- Stable release: IntFOLD version 5.0
- Preview release: IntFOLD version 6.0
- Written in: Java, Python, R
- Website: https://www.reading.ac.uk/bioinf/IntFOLD/

IntFOLD (Integrated Fold Recognition) is fully automated, integrated pipeline for prediction of 3D structure and function from amino acid sequences. The pipeline is wrapped up and deployed as a publicly-available Web Server. The core of the server method is quality assessment using built-in accuracy self-estimates (ASE) which improves performance prediction of 3D model using ModFOLD.

== Description ==
IntFOLD server provides the tertiary structure prediction at a competitive accuracy and combines the cutting edge methods including IntFOLD-TS for generation of 3D models, ModFOLD for 3D model quality estimation, ReFOLD for refinement of 3D models, DisoCLUST for disorder prediction, DomFOLD for structural domain prediction, and FunFOLD for protein ligand binding site prediction. The integration of the tools enables users to reach all related information in a pipeline. IntFOLD Web Server has completed over 200,000 structure predictions since January 2010.

The only required input is a protein sequence for the prediction of the protein 3D structure and function. The IntFOLD output is presented via a user-friendly interface for the use of life scientists. The raw data is also formatted in Critical Assessment of Methods for Protein Structure Prediction (CASP) standards with a detailed help page.

== Performance in CASP and CAMEO experiments ==
The IntFOLD method was firstly benchmarked in Critical Assessment of Techniques for Protein Structure Prediction 9 (CASP9) and ranked among the top 5. The IntFOLD server has consolidated its performance in the following CASP experiments

Its performance is being continually evaluated in Continuous Automated Model Evaluation (CAMEO) experiment.

== Applications of IntFOLD server ==
=== Public health ===
IntFOLD was used to generate 3D models of the SARS-CoV-2 targets for the CASP Commons COVID-19 initiative and elsewhere accelerating the race of vaccines and other therapeutics development with regard to COVID-19 pandemic. In other aspect of chronic diseases, IntFOLD was used to model HEV PCP, an essential protein of Hepatitis E virus causing Hepatitis E disease. Additionally, IntFOLD was used to model disordered region of the Bovine milk αS2-casein proteins which were implicated in the formation amyloidogenic fibrils some of which are known to be major causes of neurodegenerative diseases.

=== Food Security ===
IntFOLD has been used in different aspects of food security. For instance, it has been used to model effector proteins molecules that causes fungus in Barley. Furthermore, it has been applied in modelling several proteins involved in the functioning of key systems in Atlantic salmon, and HaACBP1 protein, which is vital for development and growth of sunflower, a key crop plant used for production of widely used cooking oil. IntFOLD was used to model Chitin proteins in Podosphaera xanthii, a causal agent of fungal disease called cucurbit powdery mildew, which hamper crop productivity.

=== Contribution to Protein Structure Prediction Methods Development ===
IntFOLD has been used as one of the standard server-based methods in validating the performance of some of the newer methods used in prediction of the 3D-protein models. This is important in advancing the structural bioinformatics field.
