= Structural bioinformatics =

Bioinformatics subfield

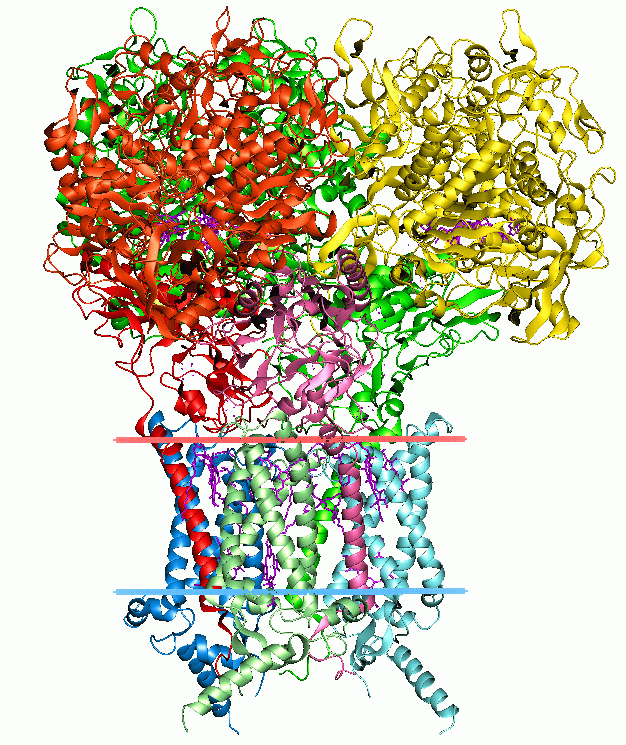
Three-dimensional structure of a protein

Structural bioinformatics is the branch of bioinformatics that is related to the analysis and prediction of the three-dimensional structure of biological macromolecules such as proteins, RNA, and DNA. It deals with generalizations about macromolecular 3D structures such as comparisons of overall folds and local motifs, principles of molecular folding, evolution, binding interactions, and structure/function relationships, working both from experimentally solved structures and from computational models. The term structural has the same meaning as in structural biology, and structural bioinformatics can be seen as a part of computational structural biology. The main objective of structural bioinformatics is the creation of new methods of analysing and manipulating biological macromolecular data in order to solve problems in biology and generate new knowledge.

== Introduction ==
=== Protein structure ===
The structure of a protein is directly related to its function. The presence of certain chemical groups in specific locations allows proteins to act as enzymes, catalyzing several chemical reactions. In general, protein structures are classified into four levels: primary (sequences), secondary (local conformation of the polypeptide chain), tertiary (three-dimensional structure of the protein fold), and quaternary (association of multiple polypeptide structures). Structural bioinformatics mainly addresses interactions among structures taking into consideration their space coordinates. Thus, the primary structure is better analyzed in traditional branches of bioinformatics. However, the sequence implies restrictions that allow the formation of conserved local conformations of the polypeptide chain, such as alpha-helix, beta-sheets, and loops (secondary structure). Also, weak interactions (such as hydrogen bonds) stabilize the protein fold. Interactions could be intrachain, i.e., when occurring between parts of the same protein monomer (tertiary structure), or interchain, i.e., when occurring between different structures (quaternary structure). Finally, the topological arrangement of interactions, whether strong or weak, and entanglements is being studied in the field of structural bioinformatics, utilizing frameworks such as circuit topology.

=== Structure visualization ===
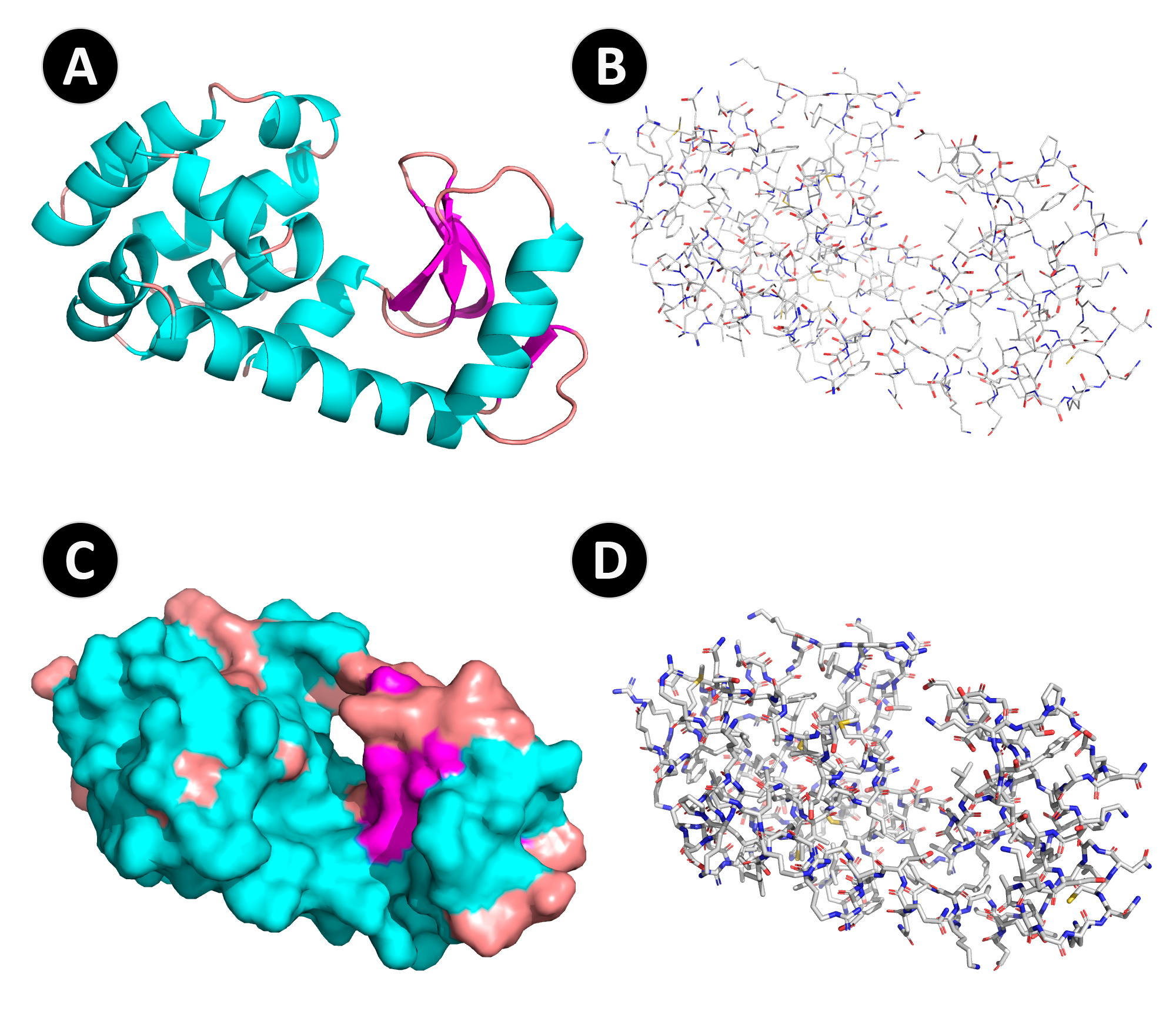
Structural visualization of BACTERIOPHAGE T4 LYSOZYME (PDB ID: 2LZM). (A) Cartoon; (B) Lines; (C) Surface; (D) Sticks.

Protein structure visualization is an important issue for structural bioinformatics. It allows users to observe static or dynamic representations of the molecules, also allowing the detection of interactions that may be used to make inferences about molecular mechanisms. The most common types of visualization are:

- Cartoon: this type of protein visualization highlights the secondary structure differences. In general, α-helix is represented as a type of screw, β-strands as arrows, and loops as lines.
- Lines: each amino acid residue is represented by thin lines, which allows a low cost for graphic rendering.
- Surface: in this visualization, the external shape of the molecule is shown.
- Sticks: each covalent bond between amino acid atoms is represented as a stick. This type of visualization is most used to visualize interactions between amino acids...

=== DNA structure ===
The classic DNA duplexes structure was initially described by Watson and Crick (and contributions of Rosalind Franklin). The DNA molecule is composed of three substances: a phosphate group, a pentose, and a nitrogen base (adenine, thymine, cytosine, or guanine). The DNA double helix structure is stabilized by hydrogen bonds formed between base pairs: adenine with thymine (A-T) and cytosine with guanine (C-G). Many structural bioinformatics studies have focused on understanding interactions between DNA and small molecules, which has been the target of several drug design studies.

=== Interactions ===
Interactions are contacts established between parts of molecules at different levels. They are responsible for stabilizing protein structures and perform a varied range of activities. In biochemistry, interactions are characterized by the proximity of atom groups or molecules regions that present an effect upon one another, such as electrostatic forces, hydrogen bonding, and hydrophobic effect. Proteins can perform several types of interactions, such as protein-protein interactions (PPI), protein-peptide interactions, protein-ligand interactions (PLI), and protein-DNA interaction.

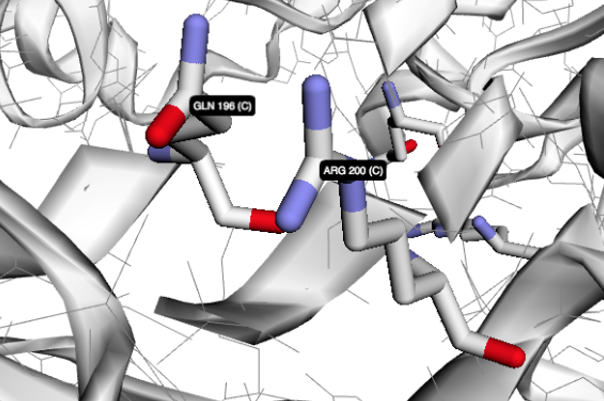
Contacts between two amino acid residues: Q196-R200 (PDB ID- 2X1C)

=== Calculating contacts ===
Calculating contacts is an important task in structural bioinformatics, being important for the correct prediction of protein structure and folding, thermodynamic stability, protein-protein and protein-ligand interactions, docking and molecular dynamics analyses, and so on.

Traditionally, computational methods have used threshold distance between atoms (also called cutoff) to detect possible interactions. This detection is performed based on Euclidean distance and angles between atoms of determined types. However, most of the methods based on simple Euclidean distance cannot detect occluded contacts. Hence, cutoff free methods, such as Delaunay triangulation, have gained prominence in recent years. In addition, the combination of a set of criteria, for example, physicochemical properties, distance, geometry, and angles, have been used to improve the contact determination.

Distance criteria for contact definition
Type	Max distance criteria
Hydrogen bond	3,9 Å
Hydrophobic interaction	5 Å
Ionic interaction	6 Å
Aromatic Stacking	6 Å

== Protein Data Bank (PDB) ==
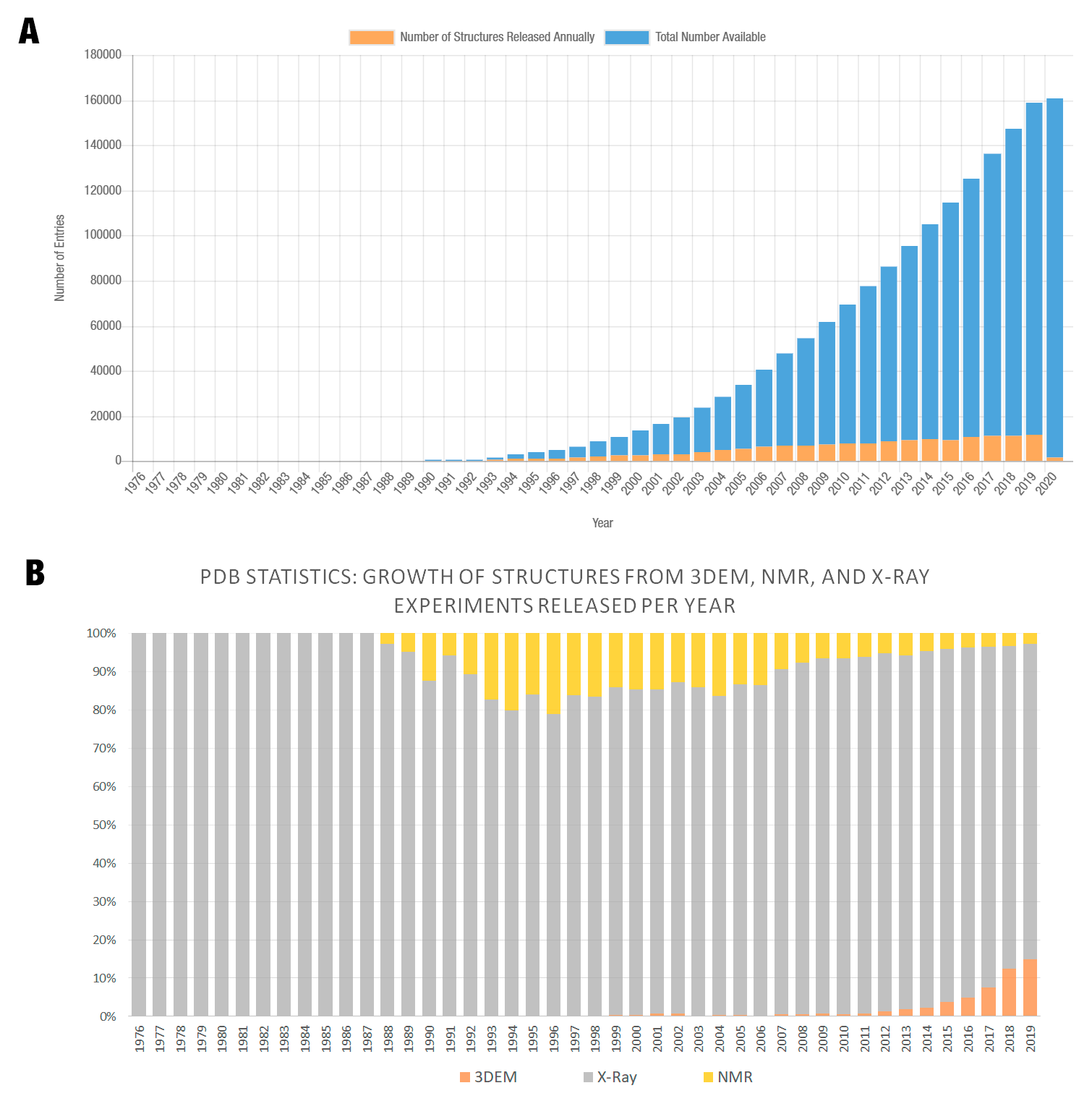
The number of structures from PDB. (A) The overall growth of released structures in Protein DataBank per year. (B) Growth of structures deposited in PDB from X-ray crystallography, NMR spectroscopy, and 3D electron microscopy experiments per year. Source: https://www.rcsb.org/stats/growth

The Protein Data Bank (PDB) is a database of 3D structure data for large biological molecules, such as proteins, DNA, and RNA. PDB is managed by an international organization called the Worldwide Protein Data Bank (wwPDB), which is composed of several local organizations, as. PDBe, PDBj, RCSB, and BMRB. They are responsible for keeping copies of PDB data available on the internet at no charge. The number of structure data available at PDB has increased each year, being obtained typically by X-ray crystallography, NMR spectroscopy, or cryo-electron microscopy.

=== Data format ===
The PDB format (.pdb) is the legacy textual file format used to store information of three-dimensional structures of macromolecules used by the Protein Data Bank. Due to restrictions in the format structure conception, the PDB format does not allow large structures containing more than 62 chains or 99999 atom records.

The PDBx/mmCIF (macromolecular Crystallographic Information File) is a standard text file format for representing crystallographic information. Since 2014, the PDB format was substituted as the standard PDB archive distribution by the PDBx/mmCIF file format (.cif). While PDB format contains a set of records identified by a keyword of up to six characters, the PDBx/mmCIF format uses a structure based on key and value, where the key is a name that identifies some feature and the value is the variable information.

=== Other structural databases ===
In addition to the Protein Data Bank (PDB), there are several databases of protein structures and other macromolecules. Examples include:

- MMDB: Experimentally determined three-dimensional structures of biomolecules derived from Protein Data Bank (PDB).
- Nucleic acid Data Base (NDB): Experimentally determined information about nucleic acids (DNA, RNA).
- Structural Classification of Proteins (SCOP): Comprehensive description of the structural and evolutionary relationships between structurally known proteins.
- TOPOFIT-DB: Protein structural alignments based on the TOPOFIT method.
- Electron Density Server (EDS): Electron-density maps and statistics about the fit of crystal structures and their maps.
- CASP: Prediction Center Community-wide, worldwide experiment for protein structure prediction CASP.
- PISCES server for creating non-redundant lists of proteins: Generates PDB list by sequence identity and structural quality criteria.
- The Structural Biology Knowledgebase: Tools to aid in protein research design.
- ProtCID: The Protein Common Interface Database Database of similar protein-protein interfaces in crystal structures of homologous proteins.
- AlphaFold:AlphaFold - Protein Structure Database.

== Structure comparison ==
=== Structural alignment ===
Structural alignment is a method for comparison between 3D structures based on their shape and conformation. It could be used to infer the evolutionary relationship among a set of proteins even with low sequence similarity. Structural alignment implies superimposing a 3D structure over a second one, rotating and translating atoms in corresponding positions (in general, using the C_{α} atoms or even the backbone heavy atoms C, N, O, and C_{α}). Usually, the alignment quality is evaluated based on the root-mean-square deviation (RMSD) of atomic positions, i.e., the average distance between atoms after superimposition:

$$\mathrm{RMSD}=\sqrt{\frac{1}{N}\sum_{i=1}^N\delta_i^2}$$

where δ_{i} is the distance between atom i and either a reference atom corresponding in the other structure or the mean coordinate of the N equivalent atoms. In general, the RMSD outcome is measured in Ångström (Å) unit, which is equivalent to 10^{−10} m. The nearer to zero the RMSD value, the more similar are the structures.

=== Graph-based structural signatures ===
Structural signatures, also called fingerprints, are macromolecule pattern representations that can be used to infer similarities and differences. Comparisons among a large set of proteins using RMSD still is a challenge due to the high computational cost of structural alignments. Structural signatures based on graph distance patterns among atom pairs have been used to determine protein identifying vectors and to detect non-trivial information. Furthermore, linear algebra and machine learning can be used for clustering protein signatures, detecting protein-ligand interactions, predicting ΔΔG, and proposing mutations based on Euclidean distance.

== Structure prediction ==
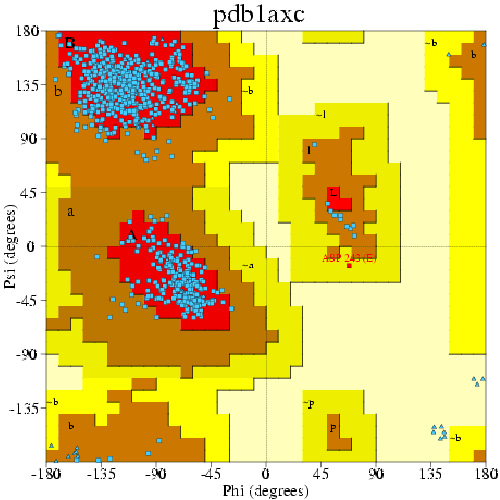
A Ramachandran plot generated from human PCNA (PDB ID 1AXC). The red, brown, and yellow regions represent the favored, allowed, and "generously allowed" regions as defined by ProCheck. This plot can be used to verify incorrectly modeled amino acids.

The atomic structures of molecules can be obtained by several methods, such as X-ray crystallography (XRC), NMR spectroscopy, and 3D electron microscopy; however, these processes can present high costs and sometimes some structures can be hardly established, such as membrane proteins. Hence, it is necessary to use computational approaches for determining 3D structures of macromolecules. The structure prediction methods are classified into comparative modeling and de novo modeling.

=== Comparative modeling ===
Comparative modeling, also known as homology modeling, corresponds to the methodology to construct three-dimensional structures from an amino acid sequence of a target protein and a template with known structure. The literature has described that evolutionarily related proteins tend to present a conserved three-dimensional structure. In addition, sequences of distantly related proteins with identity lower than 20% can present different folds.

=== De novo modeling ===
In structural bioinformatics, de novo modeling, also known as ab initio modeling, refers to approaches for obtaining three-dimensional structures from sequences without the necessity of a homologous known 3D structure. Despite the new algorithms and methods proposed in the last years, de novo protein structure prediction is still considered one of the remain outstanding issues in modern science.

=== Structure validation ===
After structure modeling, an additional step of structure validation is necessary since many of both comparative and 'de novo' modeling algorithms and tools use heuristics to try assembly the 3D structure, which can generate many errors. Some validation strategies consist of calculating energy scores and comparing them with experimentally determined structures. For example, the DOPE score is an energy score used by the MODELLER tool for determining the best model.

Another validation strategy is calculating φ and ψ backbone dihedral angles of all residues and construct a Ramachandran plot. The side-chain of amino acids and the nature of interactions in the backbone restrict these two angles, and thus, the visualization of allowed conformations could be performed based on the Ramachandran plot. A high quantity of amino acids allocated in no permissive positions of the chart is an indication of a low-quality modeling.

=== Prediction tools ===
A list with commonly used software tools for protein structure prediction, including comparative modeling, protein threading, de novo protein structure prediction, and secondary structure prediction is available in the list of protein structure prediction software.

== Molecular docking ==
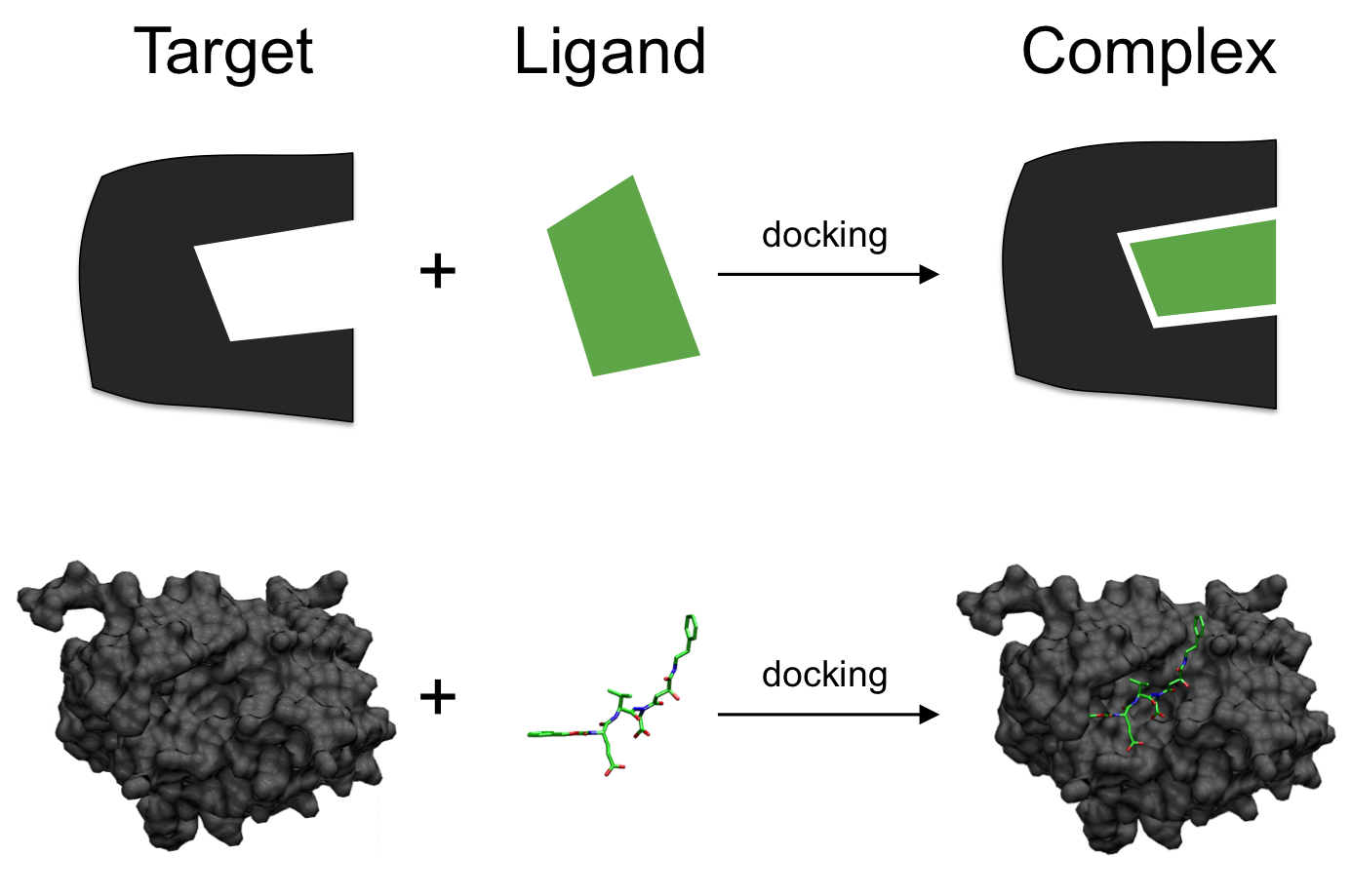
Representation of docking a ligand (green) to a protein target (black).

Molecular docking (also referred to only as docking) is a method used to predict the orientation coordinates of a molecule (ligand) when bound to another one (receptor or target). The binding may be mostly through non-covalent interactions while covalently linked binding can also be studied. Molecular docking aims to predict possible poses (binding modes) of the ligand when it interacts with specific regions on the receptor. Docking tools use force fields to estimate a score for ranking best poses that favored better interactions between the two molecules.

In general, docking protocols are used to predict the interactions between small molecules and proteins. However, docking also can be used to detect associations and binding modes among proteins, peptides, DNA or RNA molecules, carbohydrates, and other macromolecules.

=== Virtual screening ===
Virtual screening (VS) is a computational approach used for fast screening of large compound libraries for drug discovery. Usually, virtual screening uses docking algorithms to rank small molecules with the highest affinity to a target receptor.

In recent times, several tools have been used to evaluate the use of virtual screening in the process of discovering new drugs. However, problems such as missing information, inaccurate understanding of drug-like molecular properties, weak scoring functions, or insufficient docking strategies hinder the docking process. Hence, the literature has described that it is still not considered a mature technology.

== Molecular dynamics ==
Example: molecular dynamics of a glucose-tolerant β-Glucosidase

Molecular dynamics (MD) is a computational method for simulating interactions between molecules and their atoms during a given period of time. This method allows the observation of the behavior of molecules and their interactions, considering the system as a whole. To calculate the behavior of the systems and, thus, determine the trajectories, an MD can use Newton's equation of motion, in addition to using molecular mechanics methods to estimate the forces that occur between particles (force fields).

== Applications ==
Informatics approaches used in structural bioinformatics are:

- Selection of Target - Potential targets are identified by comparing them with databases of known structures and sequence. The importance of a target can be decided on the basis of published literature. Target can also be selected on the basis of its protein domain. Protein domains are building blocks that can be rearranged to form new proteins. They can be studied in isolation initially.
- Tracking X-ray crystallography trials - X-Ray crystallography can be used to reveal three-dimensional structure of a protein. But, in order to use X-ray for studying protein crystals, pure proteins crystals must be formed, which can take a lot of trials. This leads to a need for tracking the conditions and results of trials. Furthermore, supervised machine learning algorithms can be used on the stored data to identify conditions that might increase the yield of pure crystals.
- Analysis of X-Ray crystallographic data - The diffraction pattern obtained as a result of bombarding X-rays on electrons is Fourier transform of electron density distribution. There is a need for algorithms that can deconvolve Fourier transform with partial information ( due to missing phase information, as the detectors can only measure amplitude of diffracted X-rays, and not the phase shifts ). Extrapolation technique such as Multiwavelength anomalous dispersion can be used to generate electron density map, which uses the location of selenium atoms as a reference to determine rest of the structure. Standard Ball-and-stick model is generated from the electron density map.
- Analysis of NMR spectroscopy data - Nuclear magnetic resonance spectroscopy experiments produce two (or higher) dimensional data, with each peak corresponding to a chemical group within the sample. Optimization methods are used to convert spectra into three dimensional structures.
- Correlating Structural information with functional information - Structural studies can be used as probe for structural-functional relationship.

=== Tools ===
List of structural bioinformatics tools
Software	Description
I-TASSER	Predicting three-dimensional structure model of protein molecules from amino acid sequences.
MOE	Molecular Operating Environment (MOE) is an extensive platform including structural modeling for proteins, protein families and antibodies
SBL	The Structural Bioinformatics Library: end-user applications and advanced algorithms
BALLView	Molecular modeling and visualization
STING	Visualization and analysis
PyMOL	Viewer and modeling
VMD	Viewer, molecular dynamics
Gromacs	Protein folding, molecular dynamics, molecular model refinement, molecular model force field generation
LAMMPS	Protein folding, molecular dynamics, molecular model refinement, Quantum mechanical macro-molecular interactions
GAMESS	Molecular Force Field, Charge refinement, Quantum molecular dynamics, Protein-Molecular chemical reaction simulations (electron transfer),
KiNG	An open-source Java kinemage viewer
STRIDE	Determination of secondary structure from coordinates
DSSP	Algorithm assigning a secondary structure to the amino acids of a protein
MolProbity	Structure-validation web server
PROCHECK	A structure-validation web service
CheShift	A protein structure-validation on-line application
3D-mol.js	A molecular viewer for web applications developed using Javascript
PROPKA	Rapid prediction of protein pKa values based on empirical structure/function relationships
CARA	Computer Aided Resonance Assignment
Docking Server	A molecular docking web server
StarBiochem	A java protein viewer, features direct search of protein databank
SPADE	The structural proteomics application development environment
PocketSuite	A web portal for various web-servers for binding site-level analysis. PocketSuite is divided into:: PocketDepth (Binding site prediction) PocketMatch (Binding site comparison), PocketAlign (Binding site alignment), and PocketAnnotate (Binding site annotation).
MSL	An open-source C++ molecular modeling software library for the implementation of structural analysis, prediction and design methods
PSSpred	Protein secondary structure prediction
Proteus	Webtool for suggesting mutation pairs
SDM	A server for predicting effects of mutations on protein stability

== See also ==
- MMDB
- Protein Data Bank
- Structural Classification of Proteins database
- STING
- Molecular modelling
- List of software for molecular mechanics modeling
- Protein structure prediction
- CASP
- Backbone-dependent rotamer library
