= Rachel Karchin =

Computational biologist

- Education: University of California, Santa Cruz
- Awards: ISCB Fellow (2025)
- Scientific career
- Institutions: Johns Hopkins University
- Thesis: Evaluating Local Structure Alphabets for Protein Structure Prediction (2003)
- Doctoral advisor: Kevin Karplus

Rachel Karchin is a computational biologist working in computational cancer genomics. She is a professor of biomedical engineering, oncology and computer science at Johns Hopkins University.

== Early life and education ==
Karchin received her BS (1998) in computer engineering and her MS (2000) and PhD (2003) in computer science from the University of California, Santa Cruz. Her doctoral thesis, titled "Evaluating Local Structure Alphabets for Protein Structure Prediction" was supervised by Kevin Karplus.

== Career and research ==
From 2003-2006, Karchin was a postdoctoral fellow in the lab of Andrej Šali at the University of California, San Francisco.

== Awards and honours ==
In 2025, Karchin was named by the International Society for Computational Biology (ISCB) as an ISCB Fellow.
