= Kevin Karplus =

Kevin John Karplus
- Karplus in 2004
- Born: November 30, 1954 (age 71); Chicago, Illinois, U.S.
- Education: Stanford University
- Known for: Karplus–Strong string synthesis, protein structure prediction particularly success in CASP
- Awards: Excellence in Teaching Award UCSC Senate, 2004, Herzog Mathematics Competition, 1973
- Scientific career
- Fields: Computer Science
- Workplaces: University of California, Santa Cruz
- Thesis: CHISEL: An Extension to the Programming Language C for VLSI Layout (1983)
- Doctoral advisor: Jeff Ullman
- Doctoral students: Rachel Karchin

Kevin Karplus (born November 30, 1954) is a professor emeritus in the Biomolecular Engineering Department at University of California, Santa Cruz. He is best known for his work on the Karplus–Strong string synthesis algorithm he did as a computer science graduate student at Stanford University.

== Career ==
Karplus taught Very-large-scale integration (VLSI) design and computer engineering for several years, helping create the Computer Engineering Department at University of California, Santa Cruz. He made some contributions to VLSI Computer-aided design (CAD), particularly to logic minimization, where he invented the if-then-else DAG (a generalization of the binary decision diagram) and a canonical form for it, before switching to protein structure prediction and bioinformatics in 1995. His doctoral students have included Rachel Karchin.

He has participated in CASP (Critical Assessment of Techniques for Protein Structure Prediction) since CASP2 in 1996, and has been invited to present papers at CASP2, 3, 4, 5, 6, 7, and 8.

He served on the Board of Directors for the International Society for Computational Biology from 2005 to 2011.

== Personal life ==
Karplus has long been a bicycle advocate. In 1994, the League of American Bicyclists gave him the Phyllis W. Harmon Volunteer-of-the-Year Award. In 2001, he was given a Lifetime Achievement Award by Santa Cruz County Regional Transportation Commission for long standing commitment to improving bicycle transportation in Santa Cruz County. He was also one of the founding members of People Power, a bicycle advocacy group in Santa Cruz.
