= Michael Sternberg =

Professor (born 1951)

Mike Sternberg
- Born: Michael Joseph Ezra Sternberg; 24 June 1951 (age 75)
- Education: University of Cambridge (BA); Imperial College London (MSc); University of Oxford (DPhil)
- Awards: FRSB; FIBiol (2001)
- Scientific career
- Fields: Bioinformatics; Cheminformatics; Systems biology; Machine learning; Drug design; Protein structure prediction
- Workplaces: Imperial College London; University of Oxford; University of Cambridge; Birkbeck College London; Imperial Cancer Research Fund
- Thesis: Studies of Protein Conformation (1977)
- Doctoral advisor: David Chilton Phillips
- Website: www.imperial.ac.uk/people/m.sternberg

Michael Joseph Ezra Sternberg (born 24 June 1951) is a professor at Imperial College London, where he is director of the Centre for Integrative Systems Biology and Bioinformatics and Head of the Structural bioinformatics Group.

== Education ==
Sternberg was educated at Hendon County Grammar School and Gonville and Caius College, Cambridge, where he was awarded a Bachelor of Arts degree in natural sciences (theoretical physics) in 1972. He went on to do a Master of Science degree in Computing at Imperial College London followed by a DPhil degree from the University of Oxford (Wolfson College, Oxford) in 1978 for research supervised by David Chilton Phillips.

== Career ==
After postdoctoral research at the University of Oxford, Sternberg became a Lecturer in the Department of Crystallography at Birkbeck College, London. He went on to work at the Imperial Cancer Research Fund and joined Imperial College in 2001. He is the Director of the Centre for Integrative Systems Biology and Bioinformatics at Imperial College.

== Research ==
Sternberg's research interests are in protein structure prediction, protein function prediction, prediction of macromolecular docking and interactions, network modelling for systems biology and logic-based drug design.

He has authored or co-authored several books including From Cells to Atoms: an illustrated introduction to molecular biology, Protein Engineering: a practical approach and Protein Structure Prediction: a practical approach.

During his DPhil research at Oxford he worked with Janet Thornton and they undertook some of the first systematic analyses of protein structure. They identified that the beta-alpha-beta unit in proteins is nearly always right handed and this explained remarkable similarities between protein structures.

His group, particularly Lawrence Kelley, have developed the widely used Phyre/Phyre2 web server for protein structure prediction. This web resource has been used by over 100,000 distinct users worldwide.

Recently his PhD student Chris Yates developed SuSPect, a novel powerful method to predict the phenotypic effects of Single-nucleotide polymorphisms and other amino acid variants.

== Awards and honours ==
Sternberg was elected a Fellow of the Royal Society of Biology (FRSB) and a Fellow of the Institute of Biology (FIBiol). He is an associate editor of the Journal of Molecular Biology. He was elected a Fellow of the Academy of Medical Sciences in 2026.
