= Supercomputing Facility for Bioinformatics and Computational Biology =

Supercomputing Facility for Bioinformatics and Computational Biology, IIT Delhi
- जैवसूचना विज्ञान एवं अभिकलनी जीवविज्ञान हेतु अतिअभिकलन सुविधा, भारतीय प्रौद्योगिकी संस्थान नई दिल्ली
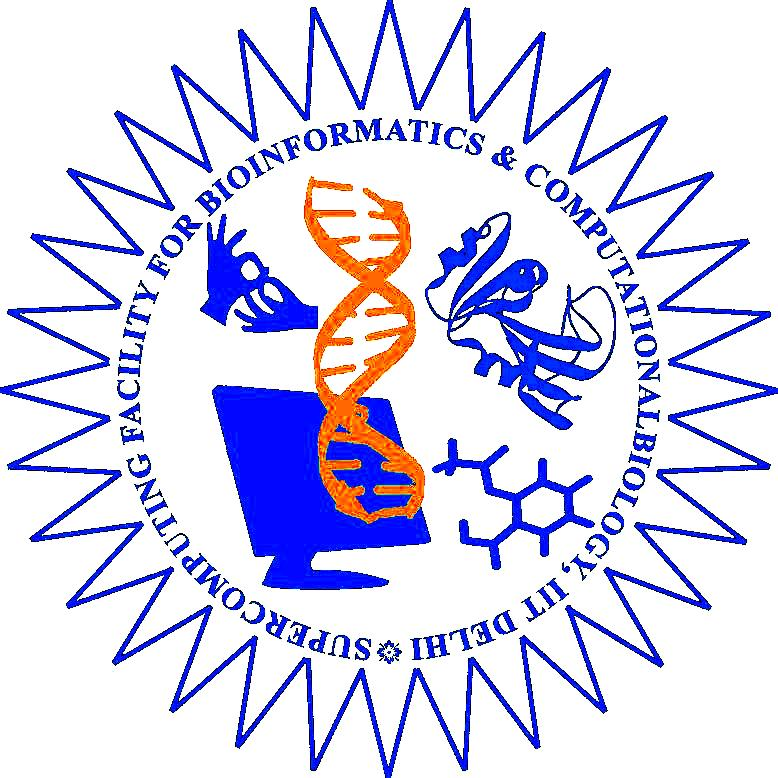
- Type: Public research
- Established: 31 July 2002
- Affiliations: Indian Institute of Technology Delhi
- Co-ordinator: Prof. B. Jayaram
- Location: New Delhi, India; 28°54′35″N 77°19′11″E
- Campus: Urban
- Website: SCFBio

Supercomputing Facility for Bioinformatics and Computational Biology, also known as SCFBio IIT Delhi, is a center for Bioinformatics & Computational Biology in Indian Institute of Technology, Delhi. This facility was established in 2002 under the aegis of the Department of Chemistry, IIT Delhi. It is recognized as a center of excellence in Bioinformatics by the Department of Biotechnology (DBT), Government of India.

== History ==
The Supercomputing Facility for Bioinformatics and Computational Biology, (SCFBio), IIT Delhi, was established in July 2002 with funding from Department of Biotechnology under the guidance of Prof. B. Jayaram. It aims at developing novel scientific methods and new software for genome analysis, protein structure prediction, and in silico drug design. The facility was inaugurated by the Honorable Minister of Science and Technology and Human Resource Development Shri Murli Manohar Joshi, IITD adopted SCFBio as a Central Facility of National importance in March 2003.

SCFBio was upgraded to a multi-tera FLOP facility under the Programme support from DBT and inaugurated in September 2009 by honorable secretary DBT, Dr M K Bhan. The aggregate computational power of the facility is over 50 teraFLOPS with data storage of over 150 Terabytes and a modern data center. The facility is connected via 100 Mbit/s dedicated line.

== Vision ==
"Genome to Drug" (Dhanvantari) envisages delivering drug molecules to society from genomic/proteomic information. It consists of mainly three stages:

1. Interpreting the language of genomic DNA and identifying a druggable protein-coding gene (Chemgenome) for diseases/disorders,
2. Determining the three-dimensional structure of the protein target ( Bhageerath-H) and
3. Creating small molecules (drug) that can bind with high affinity and specificity to the protein/DNA target but with the least toxicity to humans (Sanjeevini).

To develop novel scientific methods and highly efficient algorithms, combining principles of Chemistry and Biology with Information Technology for Genome analysis, Protein structure prediction, and target-directed Drug Design pursuing the dream of delivering GENOME to DRUG to the society.

== In-house software ==
S.No.	Name	Link
1.	Chemgenome3.0	link
2.	BHAGEERATH : An Energy Based Protein Structure Prediction Server	link
3.	Sanjeevini : A Complete Drug Designing Software Suite	link
4.	Bhageerath-H+	link
5.	BAPPL+	link
6.	SEARCH-ML	link
7.	BIMP Database	link
	For complete list, please visit here	

== Publications ==
S.No.	Title	Year
1.	A Physicochemical Model for Analyzing DNA Sequences	2005
2.	Bhageerath: an energy based web enabled computer software suite for limiting the search space of tertiary structures of small globular proteins	2006
3.	Sanjeevini: a freely accessible web-server for target directed lead molecule discovery	2012
4.	Physico-chemical fingerprinting of RNA genes	2016
5.	Intron exon boundary junctions in human genome have in-built unique structural and energetic signals	2021
6.	Inhibiting fungal multidrug resistance by disrupting an activator–Mediator interaction	2016
	For complete list, please visit here	

== Human resource training ==
23 Ph.D. students have completed their Ph.D. Currently, 2 students are pursuing Ph.D. in areas of genomics, proteomics, and drug design. Over 1056 participants have been trained in various aspects of bioinformatics through short-term training programs. SCFBio has organized several workshops and international conferences including InCoB 2006.

Two start-up companies have evolved (Leadinvent and Novoinformatics) so far from SCFBio. It also had a fruitful collaboration with Dabur, HCl Life Sciences, and NIIT. It forms the computational backbone to School of Biological Sciences, IIT Delhi creating a strong collaboration between computational and experimental biology.
