= Andrej Šali =

American biologist (born 1963)

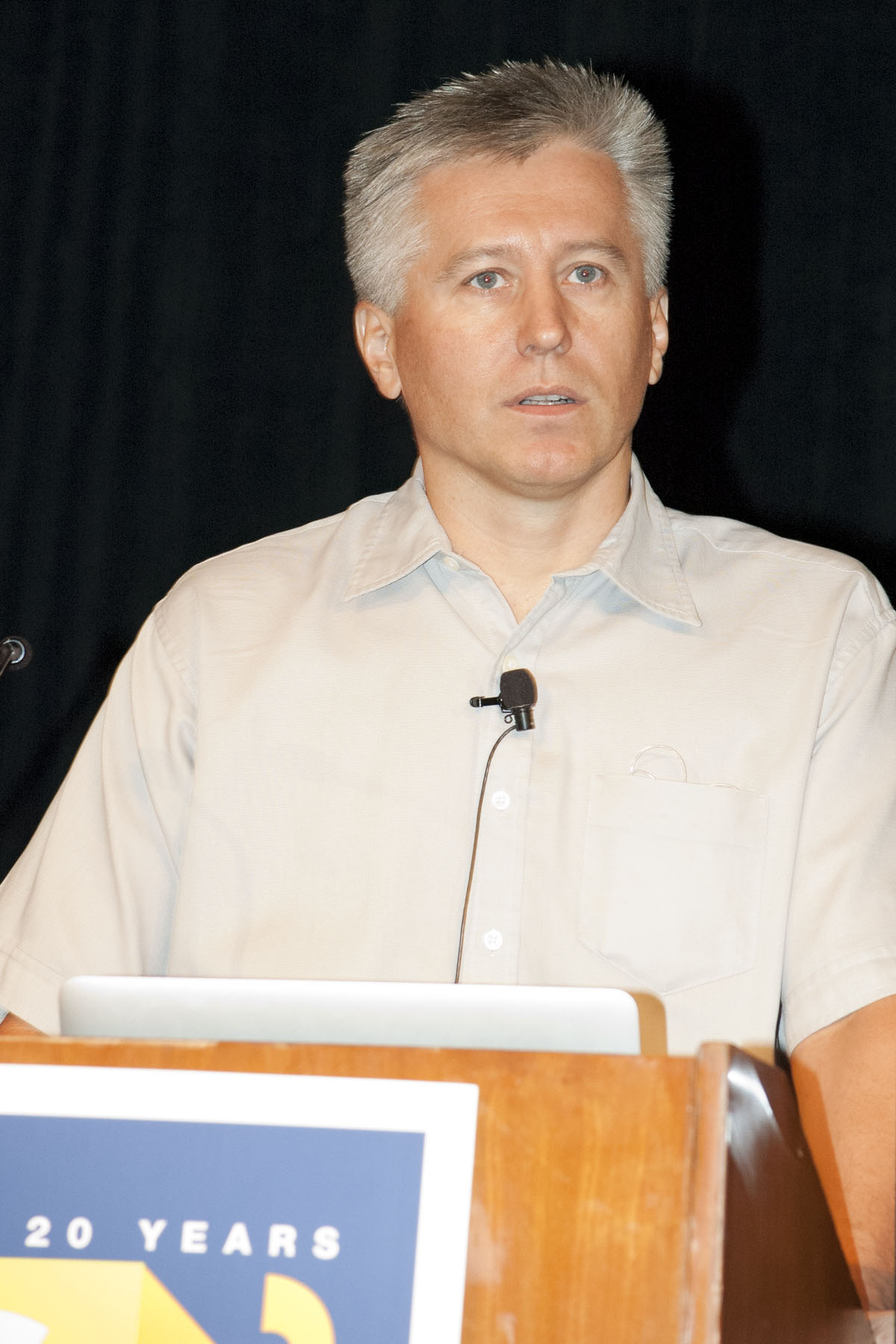
- Šali speaking at ISMB 2012.
- Born: 1963 (age 62–63)
- Education: Birkbeck College, University of London
- Scientific career
- Workplaces: University of California, San Francisco; Harvard University; Rockefeller University; Birkbeck College, University of London; University of Ljubljana
- Thesis: Modelling three-dimensional structure of a protein from its amino acid sequence (1991)
- Doctoral advisor: Tom Blundell
- Website: www.salilab.org

Andrej Šali (born 1963, Kranj, Slovenia) is a computational structural biologist. Since 2003, he has been Professor in the Department of Bioengineering and Therapeutic Sciences at University of California, San Francisco. He also serves as an editor of the journal Structure.

== Education ==
Šali received his Bachelor of Science degree in chemistry from University of Ljubljana, 1987; his Ph.D. in Molecular Biophysics from Birkbeck College, University of London, 1991 (working with Tom Blundell); and did postdoctoral work at Harvard University (working with Martin Karplus).

== Research ==
Sali joined the faculty of the Rockefeller University in 1995, following his postdoctoral research at Harvard University. He is using computation grounded in the laws of physics and evolution to study the structure and function of proteins. For example, he developed comparative protein structure modeling by satisfaction of spatial restraints, implemented in program MODELLER and integrative structure determination of macromolecular assemblies, implemented in program IMP.

== Research impact ==
Sali contributes greatly to structural biology by developing and applying computational methods for structural modeling and analysis of proteins. The two most often used programs developed by his research group include "MODELLER" for comparative protein structure modeling and "IMP" for integrative structure determination.

As of January 2022, Šali published approximately 400 papers, which were cited approximately 89,000 times per Google Scholar. His Hirsch-index is 132 (i.e., 132 publication have been cited at least 132 times).

In 2018, Šali was elected member of the National Academy of Sciences in recognition of his contributions to biophysics and computational biology.

== Notable alumni from Šali Lab ==
Name	Lab Position	Duration	Current Location	Current Position
Frank Alber	Postdoctoral Fellow		University of California, Los Angeles, California, USA	Professor
Andras Fiser	Postdoctoral Fellow	Sep 1997 to Dec 2002	Albert Einstein College of Medicine, Bronx, NY	Professor
Rachel Karchin	Postdoctoral Fellow	Aug 2003 to Aug 2006	Johns Hopkins University	Professor
Dmitry Korkin	Postdoctoral Fellow	Sep 2002 to Jul 2007	Worcester Polytechnic Institute	Professor
Marc A. Marti-Renom	Postdoctoral Fellow Adjunct Assistant Professor	Feb 1999 to Jun 2006	National Center for Genomic Analysis (CNAG), Barcelona, Spain	Group Leader
M.S. Madhusudhan	Postdoctoral Fellow	Feb 2000 to Mar 2008	IISER, Pune, India	Associate Professor
Maya Topf	Postdoctoral Fellow	2003 to 2006	Centre for Structural Systems Biology, Hamburg, Germany	Professor
David Barkan	Ph.D. Student	Sept 2006 to Oct 2011	Protagonist Therapeutics	Staff Scientist
