= Molecular Modeling Database =

MMDB

Content
- Description: 3D structures and macromolecular interactions

Contact
- Research center: National Center for Biotechnology Information
- Authors: Thomas Madej
- Primary citation: Madej & al. (2012)
- Release date: 2011

Access
- Website: https://www.ncbi.nlm.nih.gov/structure

The Molecular Modeling Database (MMDB) is a database of experimentally determined three-dimensional biomolecular structures and hosted by the National Center for Biotechnology Information.

== See also ==
- Protein structure
