= RaptorX =

Software for protein modeling and analysis

- Developer(s): XU Jinbo; LI Ming; PENG Jian; ZHU Jianwei; WANG Sheng
- Initial release: 2012; 13 years ago
- Available in: English
- Type: Bioinformatics tool for protein structure prediction
- License: Proprietary noncommercial, case-by-case
- Website: raptorx.uchicago.edu

RaptorX is a software and web server for protein structure and function prediction that is free for non-commercial use. RaptorX is among the most popular methods for protein structure prediction. Like other remote homology recognition and protein threading techniques, RaptorX is able to regularly generate reliable protein models when the widely used PSI-BLAST cannot. However, RaptorX is also significantly different from profile-based methods (e.g., HHPred and Phyre2) in that RaptorX excels at modeling of protein sequences without a large number of sequence homologs by exploiting structure information. RaptorX Server has been designed to ensure a user-friendly interface for users inexpert in protein structure prediction methods.

== Description ==
The RaptorX project was started in 2008 and RaptorX Server was released to the public in 2011.

== Standard usage ==
After pasting a protein sequence into the RaptorX submission form, a user will typically wait a couple of hours (depending on sequence length) for a prediction to complete. An email is sent to the user together with a link to a web page of results. RaptorX Server currently generates the following results: 3-state and 8-state secondary structure prediction, sequence-template alignment, 3D structure prediction, solvent accessibility prediction, disorder prediction and binding site prediction. The predicted results are displayed to support visual examination. The result files are also available for download.

RaptorX Server also produces some confidence scores indicating the quality of the predicted 3D models (in the absence of their corresponding native structures). For example, it produces P-value for relative global quality of a 3D model, global distance test (GDT) and uGDT (unnormalized-GDT) for absolute global quality of a 3D model and per-position root mean square deviation (RMSD) for absolute local quality at each residue of a 3D model.

== Applications and performance ==
Applications of RaptorX include protein structure prediction, function prediction, protein sequence-structure alignment, evolutionary classification of proteins, guiding site-directed mutagenesis and solving protein crystal structures by molecular replacement. In the Critical Assessment of Structure Prediction (CASP) CASP9 blind protein structure prediction experiment, RaptorX was ranked 2nd out of about 80 automatic structure prediction servers. RaptorX also generated the best alignments for the 50 hardest CASP9 template-based modeling (TBM) targets. In CASP10, RaptorX is the only server group among the top 10 human/server groups for the 15 most difficult CASP10 TBM targets.

== History ==
RaptorX is the successor to the RAPTOR protein structure prediction system. RAPTOR was designed and developed by Dr. Jinbo Xu and Dr. Ming Li at the University of Waterloo. RaptorX was designed and developed by a research group led by Prof. Jinbo Xu at the Toyota Technological Institute branch at Chicago.

== See also ==
- Protein structure prediction
- CASP
- List of protein structure prediction software
