= CAFASP =

Protein structure prediction experiment

CAFASP, or the Critical Assessment of Fully Automated Structure Prediction, is a large-scale blind experiment in protein structure prediction that studies the performance of automated structure prediction webservers in homology modeling, fold recognition, and ab initio prediction of protein tertiary structures based only on amino acid sequence. The experiment runs once every two years in parallel with CASP, which focuses on predictions that incorporate human intervention and expertise. Compared to related benchmarking techniques LiveBench and EVA, which run weekly against newly solved protein structures deposited in the Protein Data Bank, CAFASP generates much less data, but has the advantage of producing predictions that are directly comparable to those produced by human prediction experts. Recently CAFASP has been run essentially integrated into the CASP results rather than as a separate experiment.
