= CAMEO3D =

Continuous Automated Model EvaluatiOn (CAMEO) is a community-wide project to continuously evaluate the accuracy and reliability of protein structure prediction servers in a fully automated manner. CAMEO is a continuous and fully automated complement to the bi-annual CASP experiment.

Currently, CAMEO evaluates predictions for predicted three-dimensional protein structures (3D), ligand binding site predictions in proteins (LB), and model quality estimation tools (QE).

== Workflow ==
CAMEO performs blind assessment of protein structure prediction techniques based on the weekly releases of newly determined experimental structures by the Protein Databank (PDB). The amino acid sequences of soon to be released protein structures are submitted to the participating web-servers. The web-servers return their predictions to CAMEO, and predictions received before the experimental structures have been released are included in the assessment of prediction accuracy. In contrast to the CASP experiment, the comparison between prediction and reference data is fully automated, and therefore requires numerical distance measures which are robust against relative domain movements.

== History ==
CAMEO was developed as part of the Protein Model Portal module of the Structural Biology Knowledge Base as part of the Protein Structure Initiative. CAMEO is being developed by the computational structural biology group at the SIB Swiss Institute of Bioinformatics and the Biozentrum, University of Basel.

Earlier projects with similar aims were EVA and LiveBench.

== See also ==
- Protein structure prediction software
