= CAGI =

CAGI may refer to one of the following:

- Compressed Air and Gas Institute
- A variant of transliteration for TsAGI, Russian Central Aerohydrodynamic Institute
- Critical Assessment of Genome Interpretation, an online biology community experiment
