= Discrete optimized protein energy =

DOPE, or Discrete Optimized Protein Energy, is a statistical potential used to assess homology models in protein structure prediction. DOPE is based on an improved reference state that corresponds to noninteracting atoms in a homogeneous sphere with the radius dependent on a sample native structure; it thus accounts for the finite and spherical shape of the native structures. It is implemented in the popular homology modeling program MODELLER and used to assess the energy of the protein model generated through many iterations by MODELLER, which produces homology models by the satisfaction of spatial restraints. The models returning the minimum molpdfs can be chosen as best probable structures and can be further used for evaluating with the DOPE score. Like the current version of the MODELLER software, DOPE is implemented in Python and is run within the MODELLER environment. The DOPE method is generally used to assess the quality of a structure model as a whole. Alternatively, DOPE can also generate a residue-by-residue energy profile for the input model, making it possible for the user to spot the problematic region in the structure model.
