= Arthi Jayaraman =

Indian-American scientist

- Education: North Carolina State University; Birla Institute of Technology and Science, Pilani
- Scientific career
- Workplaces: University of Illinois at Urbana Champaign; University of Colorado at Boulder; University of Delaware
- Thesis: Computer simulation studies of pattern recognition in biomimetic polymers (2006)
- Website: Jayaraman Research Group

Arthi Jayaraman is an Indian-American scientist who is Chief Scientist AI for Materials in IBM Consulting, France. Till Spring 2026, she was a Professor of Chemical Engineering at the University of Delaware. Her research expertise involves the development of computational models to better understand structure & properties in soft materials, polymers, and biomaterials. Jayaraman was elected Fellow of the Royal Society of Chemistry in 2025, American Physical Society in 2020, and recognized as an American Chemical Society PMSE fellow in 2025.

== Early life and education ==
Jayaraman earned her undergraduate degree at the Birla Institute of Technology and Science, Pilani. She moved to the United States for her graduate studies, where she majored in chemical engineering. For her doctoral research Jayaraman studied biomimetic polymers and pattern recognition. She moved to the University of Illinois at Urbana–Champaign for a postdoctoral position, where she worked in the Department of Materials Science.

== Research and career ==
Jayaraman was appointed to the faculty at the University of Colorado Boulder, where she was made Patten Assistant Professor. Her early academic research was supported by the United States Department of Energy (DOE), and considered the use of polymer nanocomposites for electronic devices. In an effort to manipulate their optical and electronic properties, Jayaraman makes use of computational design. She created a comprehensive molecular model that allows her to simulate the (semi-)conducting properties of molecular systems, making use of graphics processing units to inform the design of polymers and additives. These computational models allow Jayaraman to better understand the dispersal of additives through the nanocomposite system, which allows for better control of the mechanical properties.

Amongst the molecular models considered by Jayaraman, she has primarily focussed on coarse-grained modeling. Coarse-grained models incorporate the anisotropic, directional and specific interactions (for example, hydrogen bonding etc.) of soft materials, including nanocomposites and biomaterials. In 2014 Jayaraman moved to the University of Delaware. Here she oversaw the graduate program in Chemical and Biomolecular Engineering (CBE). She serves on the editorial boards of the American Chemical Society journals Macromolecules (as Associate Editor) and ACS Polymers Au (Deputy Editor). She currently directs an NSF-funded NRT interdisciplinary graduate traineeship on computing and data science for materials innovation, design, and analytics ( .

== Awards and honours ==
- 2010 Department of Energy Early Career Research Award
- 2011 University of Colorado Boulder Faculty Achievement Award
- 2013 American Institute of Chemical Engineers COMSEF Division Young Investigator Award
- 2014 American Chemical Society PMSE Young Investigator Award
- 2014 University of Colorado Boulder Teaching Award
- 2016 Princeton University Saville Lectureship at Princeton University
- 2020 Elected Fellow of the American Physical Society
- 2021 American Institute of Chemical Engineers COMSEF Impact Award
- 2025 Elected Fellow of the American Chemical Society PMSE Division
- 2026 BITSAA Distinguished Alumnus Award
- Fellow, Royal Society of Chemistry

== Selected publications ==
- Ganesan, Venkat; Jayaraman, Arthi (2014). "Theory and simulation studies of effective interactions, phase behavior and morphology in polymer nanocomposites". Soft Matter. 10 (1): 13–38. Bibcode:2014SMat...10...13G. doi:10.1039/C3SM51864G. PMID 24651842.
- Jayaraman, Arthi; Schweizer, Kenneth S. (2009-11-10). "Effective Interactions and Self-Assembly of Hybrid Polymer Grafted Nanoparticles in a Homopolymer Matrix". Macromolecules. 42 (21): 8423–8434. Bibcode:2009MaMol..42.8423J. doi:10.1021/ma901631x. ISSN 0024-9297.
