= CXorf65 =

Gene on human chromosome X

Identifiers
- Aliases: CXorf65, chromosome X open reading frame 65
- External IDs: MGI: 2685460; HomoloGene: 52739; GeneCards: CXorf65; OMA:CXorf65 - orthologs

Gene location (Human)
Chr.	X chromosome (human)
Band	Xq13.1	Start	71,103,889 bp
Band	Xq13.1	End	71,106,788 bp

Gene location (Mouse)
Chr.	X chromosome (mouse)
Band	X|X D	Start	100,304,982 bp
Band	X|X D	End	100,307,598 bp
RNA expression pattern
Bgee	Human / Mouse (ortholog); Top expressed in: granulocyte; left testis; right testis; blood; testicle; bone marrow; spleen; bone marrow cell; right lung; appendix / Top expressed in: testicle; spermatid; embryo; spleen; thymus; spermatocyte; granulocyte; islet of Langerhans; placenta; adrenal gland; More reference expression data
BioGPS	n/a
Orthologs
Species	Human	Mouse
Entrez	158830	245536
Ensembl	ENSG00000204165	ENSMUSG00000090141
UniProt	A6NEN9	Q3V2K1
RefSeq (mRNA)	NM_001025265	NM_001033362; NM_001317221
RefSeq (protein)	NP_001020436	NP_001028534; NP_001304150
Location (UCSC)	Chr X: 71.1 – 71.11 Mb	Chr X: 100.3 – 100.31 Mb
PubMed search
- Wikidata
View/Edit Human	View/Edit Mouse

Human uncharacterized protein CXorf65 is encoded by the gene CXorf65, which is located on the minus strand of chromosome X. Its transcript is 834 nucleotides long and consists of 6 exons. The translated protein is 183 amino acids in length. with a molecular weight of 21.3 kDa

== Gene ==
Human chromosome X open reading frame 65 (CXorf65), also known as LOC158830 or A6NEN9, spans 2,852 base pairs on the minus strand of chromosome X at Xq13.1. It belongs to the gene family pfam 15874; a two-member family for conserved putative interleukin 2 receptor gamma chain (Il2rg) domains. Additionally, human CXorf65 is one of 413 genes which belong to gene cluster 31: Spermatids – Spermatogenesis.

Schematic depicting human CXorf65's relative location and orientation on chromosome X along with neighboring genes.

== Transcript ==
Human CXorf65's mRNA transcript contains 6 exons which form an 834 nucleotide strand.

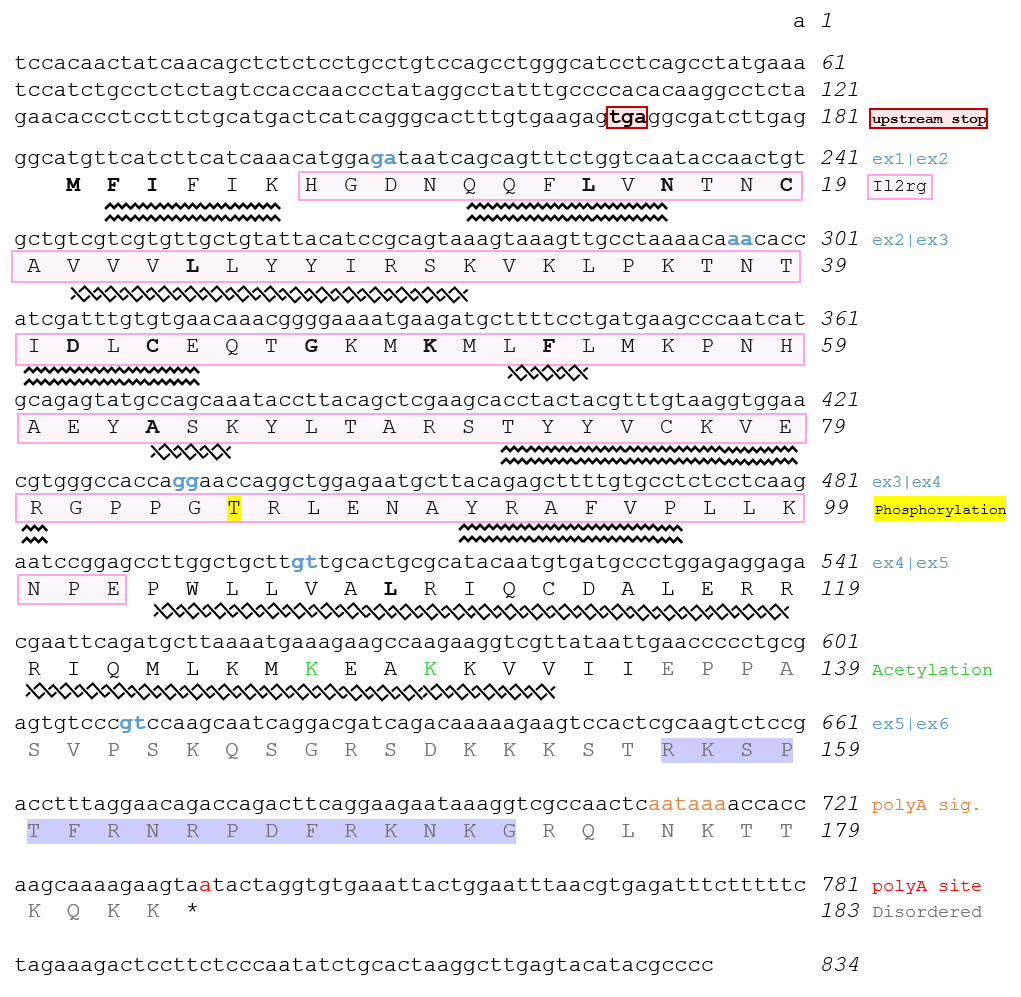
Conceptual Translation of Human CXorf65

=== Isoforms ===
Human CXorf65 has three isoforms: uncharacterized protein CXorf65, uncharacterized protein CXorf65 isoform X1, and a non-coding RNA sequence. Only uncharacterized protein CXorf65 produces a functional product.

Human uncharacterized protein CXorf65 isoform X1 is an alternative splicing that results in the exclusion of exon 4, which shortens the transcript by 69 base pairs and ultimately leads to a nonfunctional protein. The non-coding RNA sequence suffers from a frameshift mutation due to a 19 bp deletion in exon 2. This results in a premature stop codon 126 bp from the start of translation.

Human CXorf65 Isoforms
Transcript	mRNA Accession	Nucleotides	Exons	Protein Accession	Amino Acids
Uncharacterized protein CXorf65	NM_001025265.3	834	6	NP_001020436.1	183
Uncharacterized protein CXorf65 isoform X1	XM_005262244.5	765	5	XP_005262301.1	160
Non-coding RNA Sequence	NR_033212.2	815	6	Non-coding	Non-coding

=== Expression ===
Human CXorf65 is ubiquitously expressed throughout the body at low levels, typically ranging from 1-7 RPKM in most tissues; however, its expression has an affinity for testis, adrenal, thymus, and bone marrow tissues which can lead to RPKM levels increasing to 6-14 RPKM Additionally, expression can spike to as high as 27 RPKM within adrenal tissues during week 20 of fetal development.

== Protein ==
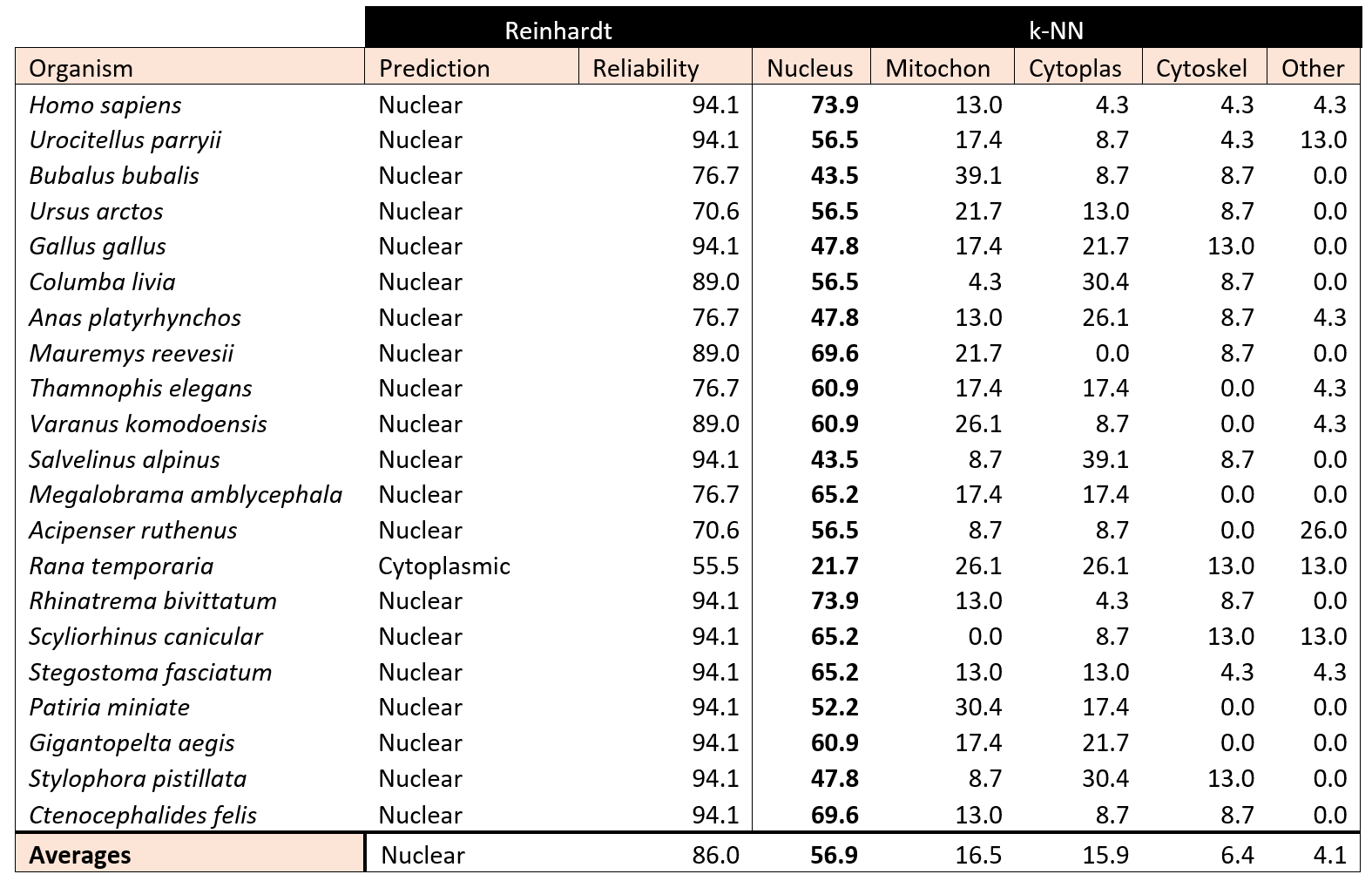
Predicted CXorf65 localization comparing ortholog localization data provided by PSORTII

Human uncharacterized protein CXorf65 consists of 183 amino acids. has a molecular weight of 21.3 kDa, and a predicted isoelectric point of 10.33. CXorf65's protein product is predicted to primarily localize within the nucleus.

=== Expression ===
Human CXorf65 maintains a low whole organism protein abundance at 0.062 ppm^{2}. It has also been identified as a member of the spermatozoa proteome.

=== Regulation ===
Human uncharacterized protein CXorf65 has a bipartite nuclear localization signal, which regulates its transport into the nucleus.

=== Structure ===
Human uncharacterized CXorf65's secondary structure is predicted to have five sections of β-sheets and four sections of α-helixesm The corresponding tertiary structure is thus predicted to be a β-grasp fold accompanied by a long basic (positively charged) tail.

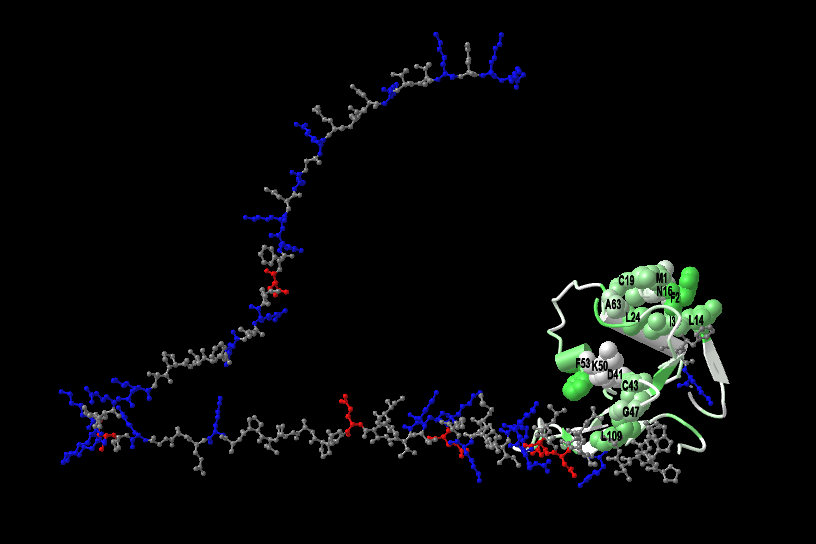
Annotated human CXorf65 predicted tertiary structure

== Post-Translational Modifications ==
Human uncharacterized protein CXorf65 has one predicted casein kinase II phosphorylation site and two predicted acetylation sites. Additionally, uncharacterized protein CXorf65 has predicted motifs for N-terminal degradation via type II destabilizing residues and a non-covalent binding site for SUMO (small ubiquitin-like modifier) proteins.

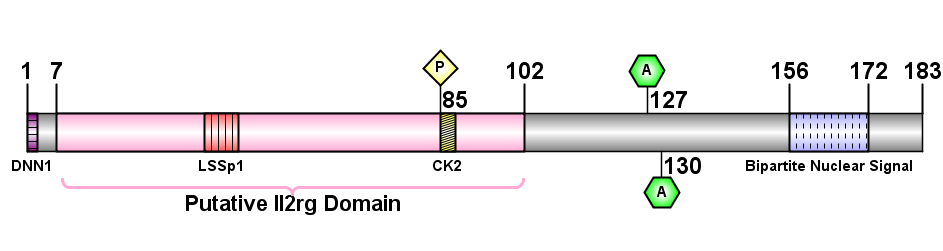
Human CXorf65 predicted post-translational modifications schematic

== Homology ==
=== Orthologs ===
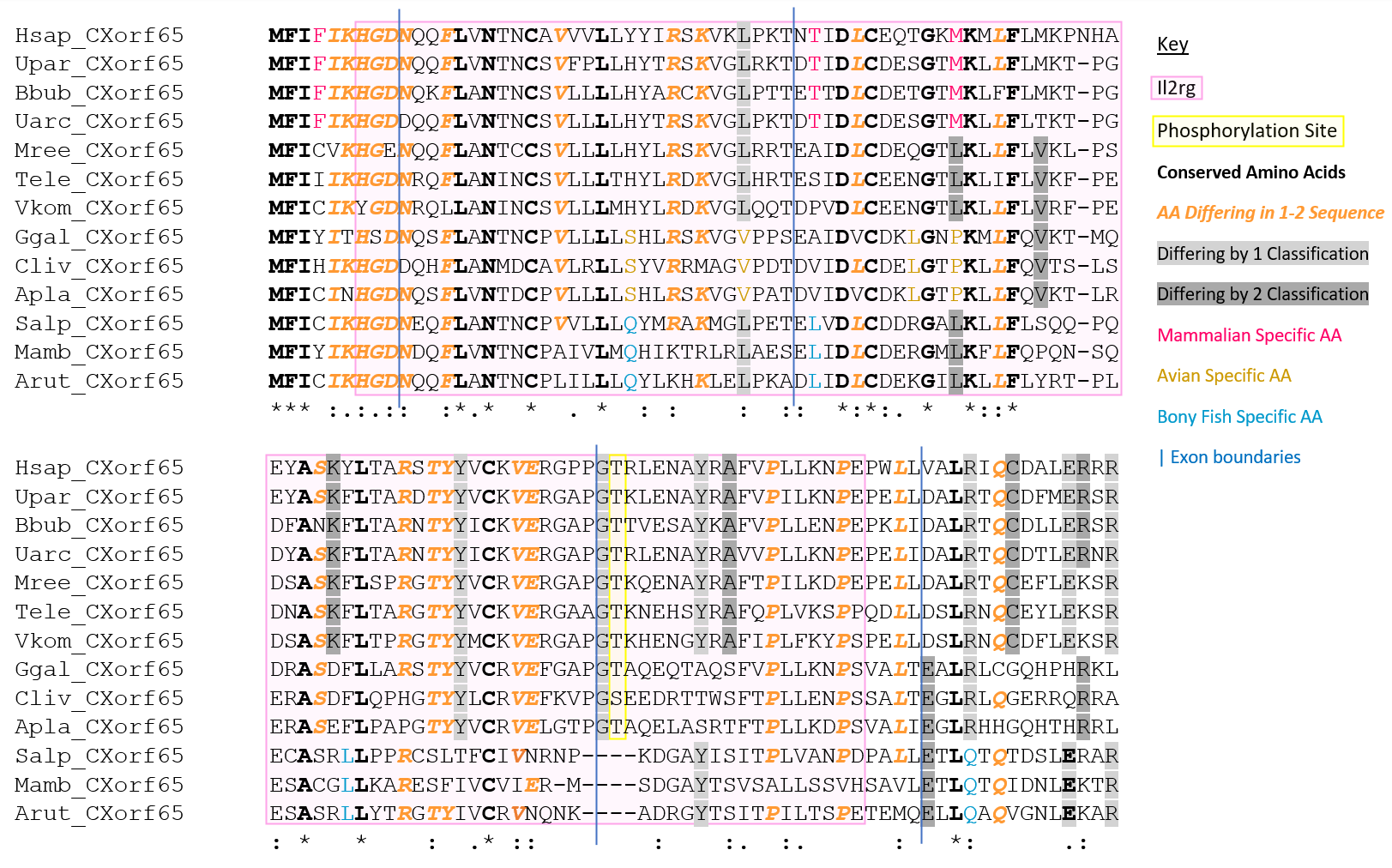
Human CXorf65 annotated strict ortholog multiple sequence alignment.

Human CXorf65 orthologs exist in mammals, reptiles, aves, amphibians, bony fish, cartilaginous fish, and the following invertebrates: Cnidaria, Platyhelminthes, Annelida, Arthropoda, Mollusca, Rotifera, Lophophorata, Echinodermata, Hemichordate Amphioxiformes, and Tunicata

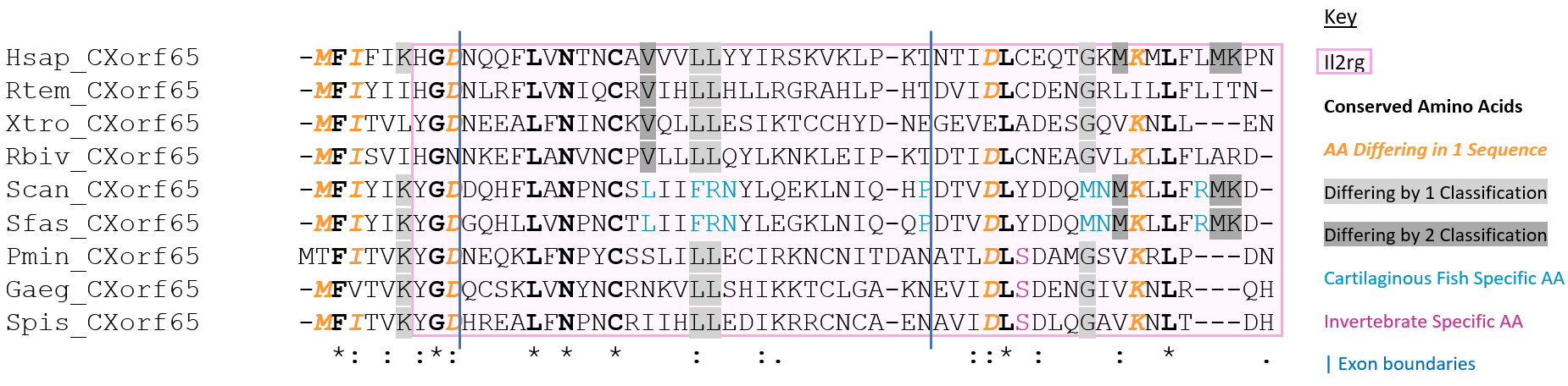
Human CXorf65 annotated distant ortholog multiple sequence alignment.

=== Paralogs ===
There are no human paralogs of CXorf65; however, there is a paralogous Il2rg domain within C22orf15,

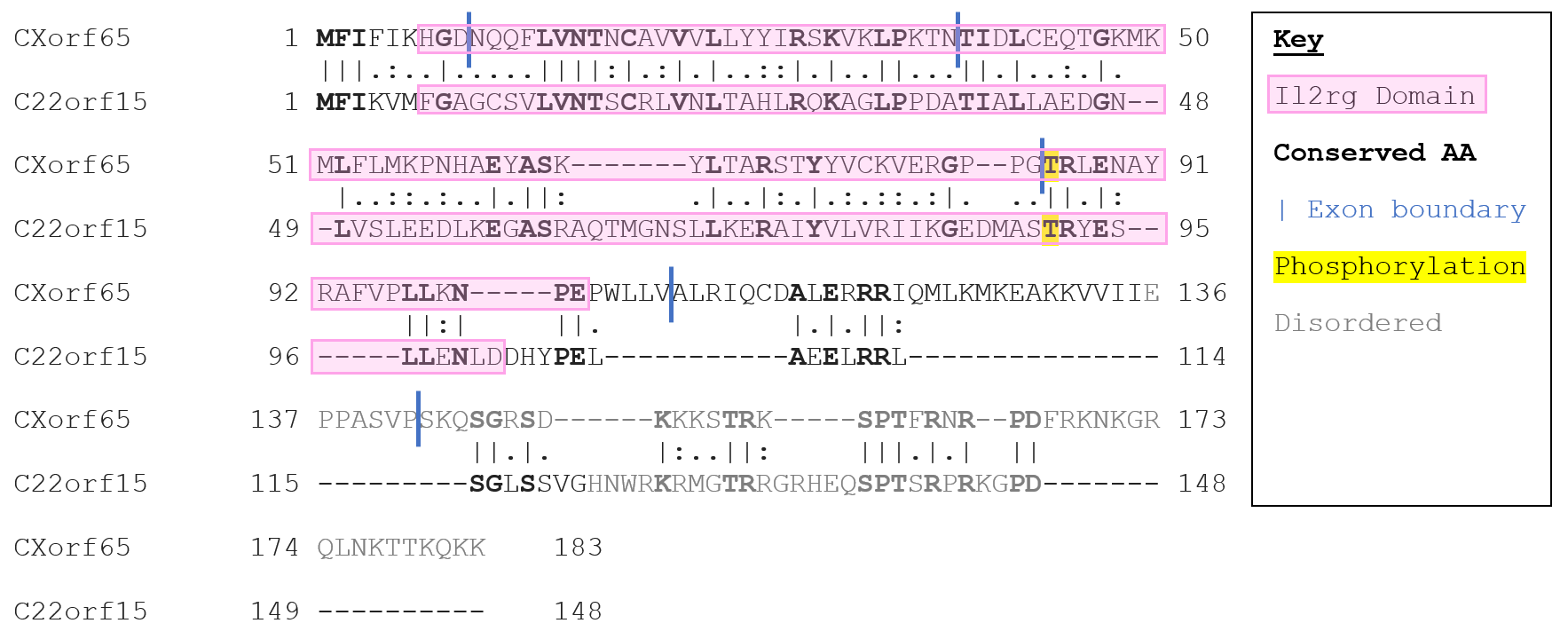
Paralogous Il2rg domains between human CXorf65 and C22orf15.

=== Evolution ===
CXorf65 is a moderately evolving gene in reference to fibrinogen alpha and cytochrome c.

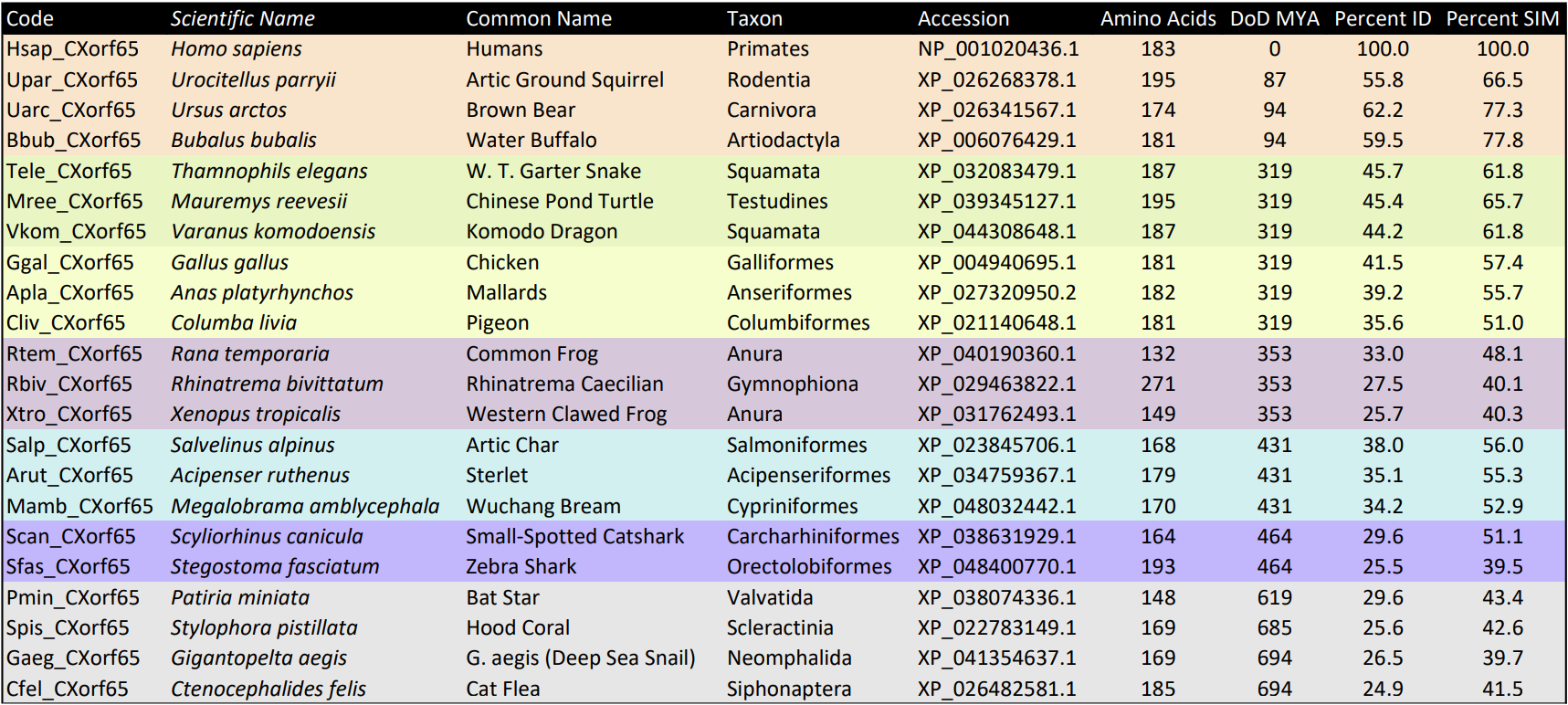
CXorf65 Ortholog Table

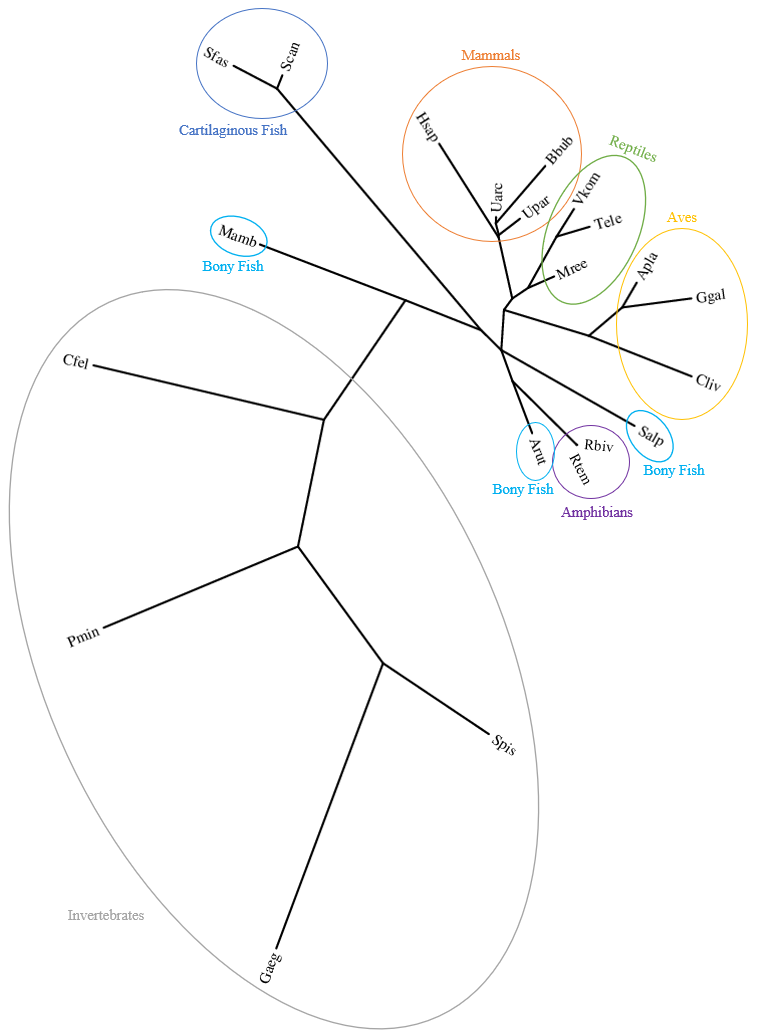
Unrooted CXorf65 Phylogenetic Tree

== Function ==
=== Interacting Proteins ===
CXorf65 has been documented to co-express with IL2RG in Mus musculus (mouse). an interleukin subunit coding gene located within the same gene neighborhood in humans at Xq13.1. Fusions between these two genes have been observed within the following organisms: Sarcophilus harrisii (Tasmanian devil), Felis catus (Cat), Cavia porcellus (Guinea pig), Ictidomys tridecemlineatus (Thirteen-lined ground squirrel), Rattus norvegicus (Brown rat), and Mus musculus (Mouse)

== Clinical Significance ==
=== Health & Disease ===
Differential expression of CXorf65 in humans is correlated to azoospermia and impaired spermatogenesis while general expression of the gene has been linked to an improved prognosis in urothelial and ovarian cancer. In WG4 temporal lobe epilepsy, human CXorf65 undergoes hypermethylation. In cases of disc herniation, acute coronary syndrome and with the presence of TGF-β in eosinophils human CXorf65 is downregulated.
