= I-TASSER =

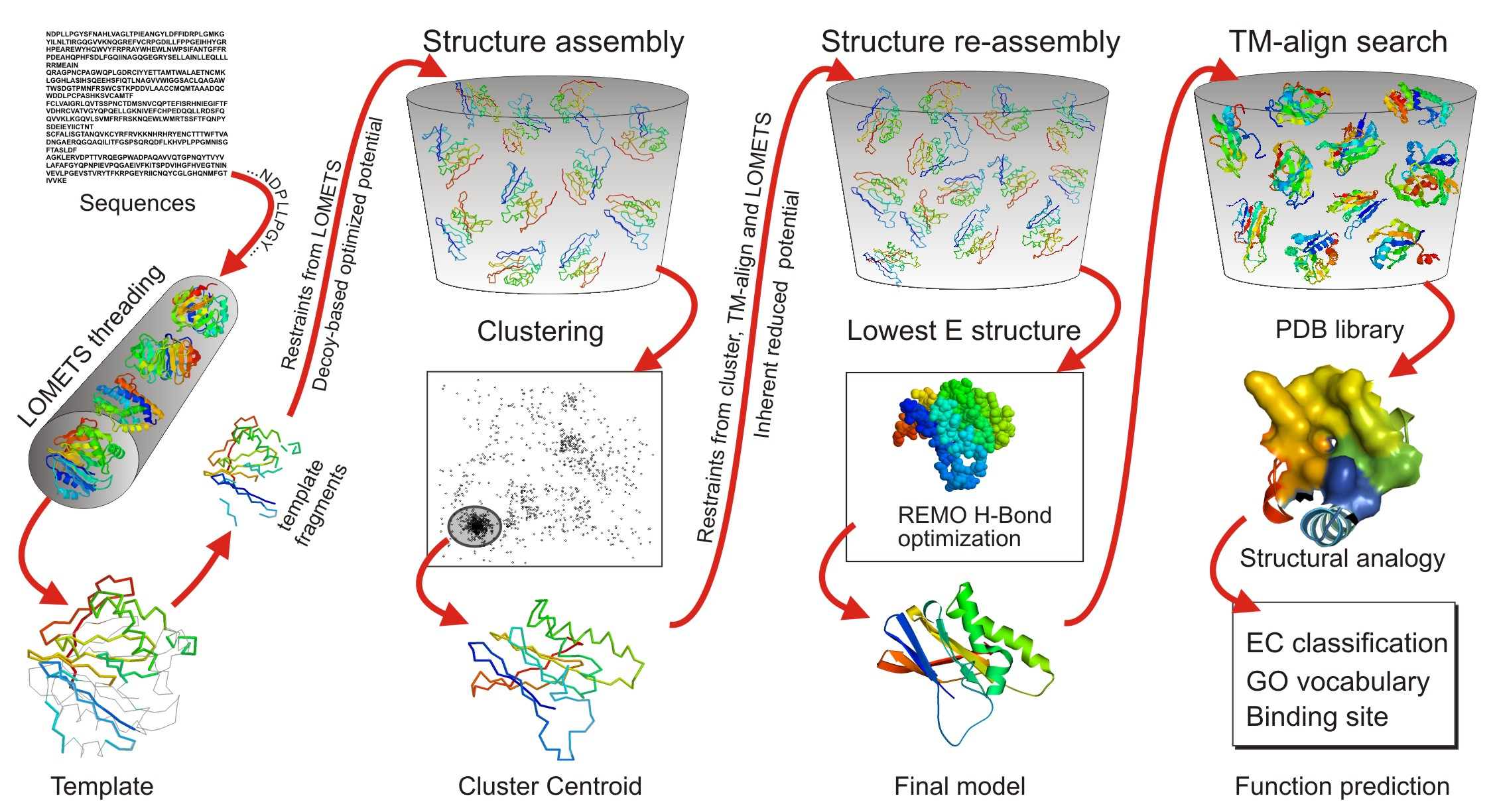
- I-TASSER pipeline for protein structure and function prediction.
- Developer: Yang Zhang Lab
- Website: zhanggroup.org/I-TASSER/

I-TASSER (Iterative Threading ASSEmbly Refinement) is a bioinformatics method for predicting three-dimensional structure model of protein molecules from amino acid sequences. It detects structure templates from the Protein Data Bank by a technique called fold recognition (or threading). The full-length structure models are constructed by reassembling structural fragments from threading templates using replica exchange Monte Carlo simulations. I-TASSER is one of the most successful protein structure prediction methods in the community-wide CASP experiments.

Following the structure prediction, I-TASSER has a component for structure-based protein function prediction, which provides annotations on ligand binding site, gene ontology and enzyme commission by structurally matching structural models of the target protein to the known proteins in protein function databases. It has an on-line server built in the Yang Zhang Lab at the National University of Singapore, allowing users to submit sequences and obtain structure and function predictions. A standalone package of I-TASSER is available for download at the I-TASSER website.

A new version D-I-TASSER, extended from I-TASSER, was recently released. D-I-TASSER combines deep learning restraints with I-TASSER structural assembly simulations and generates models with substantially higher accuracy.

== Ranking in CASP ==
I-TASSER (as 'Zhang-Server') has been consistently ranked as the top method in CASP, a community-wide experiment to benchmark the best structure prediction methods in the field of protein folding and protein structure prediction. CASP takes place every two years since 1994.

- No 1 in CASP7 (2006)
- No 1 in CASP8 (2008): Official ranking of CASP8 (164 targets)
- No 2 in CASP9 (2010): Official ranking of CASP9 (147 targets)
- No 1 in CASP10 (2012): Official ranking of CASP10 (127 targets)
- No 1 in CASP11 (2014): Official ranking of CASP11 (126 targets)
- No 1 in CASP12 (2016): Official ranking of CASP12 (96 targets)
- No 1 in CASP13 (2018): Official ranking of CASP13 (112 targets)
- No 1 in CASP14 (2020): Official ranking of CASP14 (96 targets)

== Method and pipeline ==
I-TASSER is a template-based method for protein structure and function prediction. The pipeline consists of six consecutive steps:

- 1, Secondary structure prediction by PSSpred
- 2, Template detection by LOMETS
- 3, Fragment structure assembly using replica-exchange Monte Carlo simulation
- 4, Model selection by clustering structure decoys using SPICKER
- 5, Atomic-level structure refinement by fragment-guided molecular dynamics simulation (FG-MD) or ModRefiner
- 6, Structure-based biology function annotation by COACH

== On-line Server ==
The I-TASSER server allows users to automatically generate protein structure and function predictions. The procedure follows these steps :

- Input
  - Mandatory:
    - Amino acid sequence with length from 10 to 1,500 residues
  - Optional (user can provide optionally restraints and templates to assist I-TASSER modeling):
    - Contact restraints
    - Distance maps
    - Inclusion of special templates
    - Exclusion of special templates
    - Secondary structures
- Output
  - Structure prediction:
    - Secondary structure prediction
    - Solvent accessibility prediction
    - Top 10 threading alignment from LOMETS
    - Top 5 full-length atomic models (ranked based on cluster density)
    - Top 10 proteins in PDB which are structurally closest to the predicted models
    - Estimated accuracy of the predicted models (including a confidence score of all models, predicted TM-score and RMSD for the first model, and per-residue error of all models)
    - B-factor estimation
  - Function prediction:
    - Enzyme Classification (EC) and the confidence score
    - Gene Ontology (GO) terms and the confidence score
    - Ligand-binding sites and the confidence score
    - An image of the predicted ligand-binding sites

== Standalone Suite ==
The I-TASSER Suite is a downloadable package of standalone computer programs, developed by the Yang Zhang Lab for protein structure prediction and refinement, and structure-based protein function annotations. Through the I-TASSER License, researchers have access to the following standalone programs:

- I-TASSER: A standalone I-TASSER package for protein 3D structure prediction and refinement.
- COACH: A function annotation program based on COFACTOR, TM-SITE and S-SITE.
- COFACTOR: A program for ligand-binding site, EC number & GO term prediction.
- TM-SITE: A structure-based approach for ligand-binding site prediction.
- S-SITE: A sequence-based approach for ligand-binding site prediction.
- LOMETS: A set of locally installed threading programs for meta-server protein fold-recognition.
- MUSTER: A threading program to identify templates from a non-redundant protein structure library.
- SPICKER: A clustering program to identify near-native protein model from structure decoys.
- HAAD: A program for quickly adding hydrogen atoms to protein heavy-atom structures.
- EDTSurf: A program to construct triangulated surfaces of protein molecules.
- ModRefiner: A program to construct and refine atomic-level protein models from C-alpha traces.
- NW-align: A robust program for protein sequence-to-sequence alignments by Needleman-Wunsch algorithm.
- PSSpred: A highly accurate program for protein secondary structure prediction.
- Library: I-TASSER structural and functional template library weekly updated and freely accessible to the I-TASSER users.

Help documents

- Instruction on how to download and install the I-TASSER Suite can be found at README.txt.
