= C22orf15 =

Protein-coding gene in the species Homo sapiens

Identifiers
- Aliases: C22orf15, N27C7-3, chromosome 22 open reading frame 15
- External IDs: MGI: 2685713; GeneCards: C22orf15

Gene location (Human)
Chr.	Chromosome 22 (human)
Band	22q11.23	Start	23,762,990 bp
Band	22q11.23	End	23,765,863 bp

Gene location (Mouse)
Chr.	Chromosome 10 (mouse)
Band	10|10 C1	Start	75,773,557 bp
Band	10|10 C1	End	75,776,506 bp
RNA expression pattern
Bgee	Human / Mouse (ortholog); Top expressed in: right uterine tube; olfactory zone of nasal mucosa; testicle; right testis; right lung; ventricular zone; left testis; pituitary gland; anterior pituitary; left uterine tube / Top expressed in: bone marrow; hypothalamus; ovary; blastocyst; lung; spleen; embryo; embryo; morula; adrenal gland; More reference expression data
BioGPS	n/a
Orthologs
Databases	NCBI: entry; OMA: entry
Species	Human	Mouse
Entrez	150248	333670
Ensembl	ENSG00000273579; ENSG00000169314	ENSMUSG00000050157
UniProt	Q8WYQ4	A0A1W2P7T4
RefSeq (mRNA)	NM_182520; NM_001331041; NM_001376903; NM_001376904; NM_001376905	NM_001037714; NM_001277132
RefSeq (protein)	NP_001317970; NP_872326; NP_001363832; NP_001363833; NP_001363834	NP_001264061
Location (UCSC)	Chr 22: 23.76 – 23.77 Mb	Chr 10: 75.77 – 75.78 Mb
PubMed search
- Wikidata
View/Edit Human	View/Edit Mouse

C22orf15 (Chromosome 22 Open Reading Frame 15) is a protein which, in humans, is encoded by the C22orf15 gene.

== Gene ==
The locus of C22orf15 in humans is on the long arm (q) of chromosome 22 in region 11, band 23 (22q11.23); it spans 3,340 base pairs on the plus strand from base pair 23,762,523 to 23,765,863 and contains ten introns and six exons.

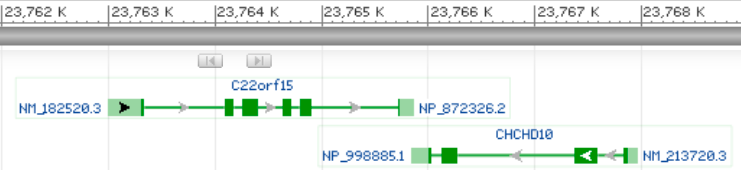
Overview of C22orf15 gene transcript

C22orf15 Gene Neighborhood

== Transcripts ==
C22orf15 is transcribed into 23 transcripts in Homo sapiens.

C22orf15 Transcripts
Transcript	Length (base pairs)	Protein	Length (amino acid)	Isoform
XM_024452160.1	1818	XP_024307928.1	243	X9
XM_011529908.2	1718	XP_011528210.2	210	X13
XM_024452161.1	1796	XP_024307929.1	236	X10
XM_017028612.1	1702	XP_016884101.1	205	X14
NM_001376903.1	881	NP_001363832.1	142	3
NM_001376904.1	800	NP_001363833.1	115	4
NM_001331041.2	900	NP_001317970.1	157	2
NM_001376905.1	790	NP_001363834.1	113	5
NM_182520.3	895	NP_872326.2	148	1
XM_017028605.1	2012	XP_016884094.1	280	X5
XM_017028613.1	1558	XP_016884102.1	185	X15
XM_017028602.1	2081	XP_016884091.1	303	X2
XM_017028606.1	1818	XP_016884095.1	273	X7
XM_017028608.1	1737	XP_016884097.1	246	X8
XM_017028604.1	2021	XP_016884093.1	283	X4
XM_024452158.1	2090	XP_024307926.1	306	X1
XM_017028611.1	1658	XP_016884100.1	227	X11
XM_011529907.2	1997	XP_011528209.1	275	X6
XM_017028614.1	1543	XP_016884103.1	180	X16
EXM_024452162.1	1537	XP_024307930.1	178	X17
XM_024452159.1	2069	XP_024307927.1	299	X3
XM_011529912.2	1838	XP_011528214.1	222	X12
XM_017028618.1	684	XP_016884107.1	105	X20

=== Promoter ===
C22orf15 has two upstream promoter regions. GXP_9794292 is 1040 base pairs in length spanning from base pair 23,758,601 to 23,759,640 on chromosome 22, while GXP_6747563 is 1740 base pairs spanning from base pair 23,761,523 to 23,763,262. The transcription start region is located at base pair 23,762,523.

=== Post-translational modifications ===
The post-translational modifications of C22orf15, which include phosphorylation, O-GlcNAcylation, and SUMOylation, are annotated on the conceptual translation.

== Structure ==
C22orf15 in humans is 148 amino acids in length. The molecular weight of human C22orf15 is 17 kdal, and the isoelectric point is 9.0. C22orf15 does not have any unusually high or low amino acid compositions compared to other proteins in humans.

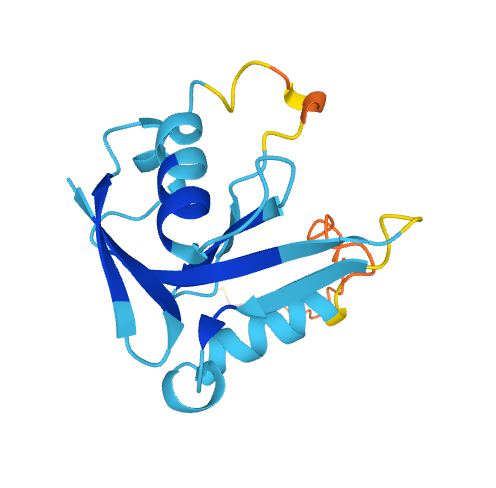
C22orf15 Tertiary Structure

The interleukin 2 receptor subunit gamma (II2rg) domain, which spans from amino acids 2-102 in C22orf15, facilitates the creation of the common gamma chain protein. This protein is a component of various receptors that aid in immune system function. These receptors direct and regulate the growth of lymphocytes, T cells, B cells, and natural killer cells, which promote immune response.

=== Secondary ===
The protein structure prediction tool I-TASSER predicts C22orf15 to have both an alpha helical and beta strand structure; there are three disordered regions present in the protein.

== Tissue distribution ==
C22orf15 is ubiquitously expressed at a low level with some variability among tissues. C22orf15 is expressed highest in the adrenal glands, salivary glands, trachea, heart, spinal cord, and skeletal muscle tissues.

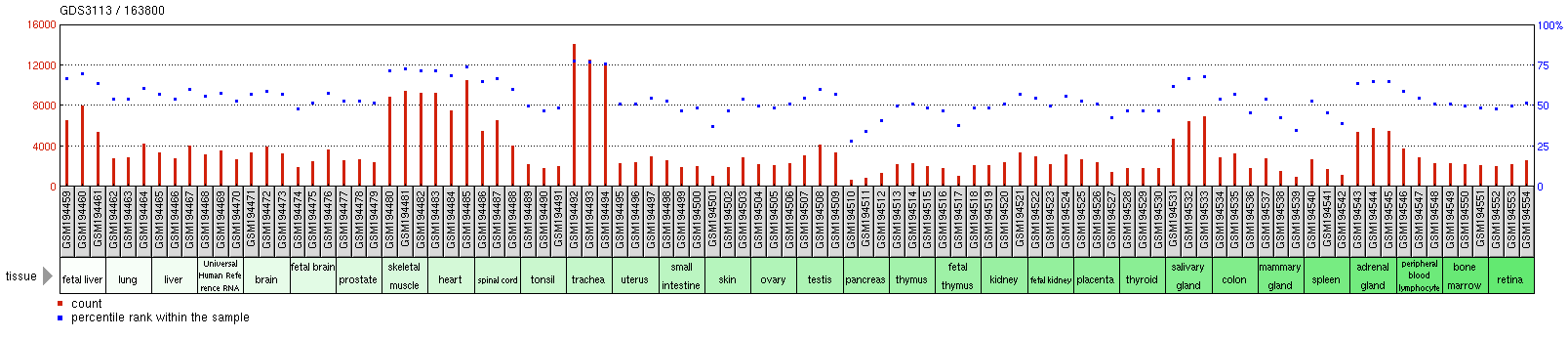
C22orf15 microarray-assessed tissue expression pattern

In an anti-C22orf15 antibody produced in rabbits, immunochemical staining shows strong cytoplasmic positivity in the glandular cells of the human colon.

== Subcellular distribution ==
C22orf15 is localized in both the nucleus and cytoplasm. Antibody staining of glandular cells in the human colon shows strong cytoplasmic positivity. However, as seen on the conceptual translation, C22orf15 has conserved nuclear localization signals that would suggest nuclear localization as well.

Homo Sapien C22orf15 Conceptual Translation

== Homology ==
Orthologous sequences to C22orf15 in humans are found in mammals, aves, reptiles, amphibians, and fishes as seen in the C22orf15 orthologs table. C22orf15 has no paralogs and is not present in invertebrates (Porifera, Platyhelminthes, Nematoda, Annelida, Echinodermata, Mollusca, Arthropoda), fungi, or bacteria; the gene appears to have originated in cartilaginous fishes approximately 473 million years ago.

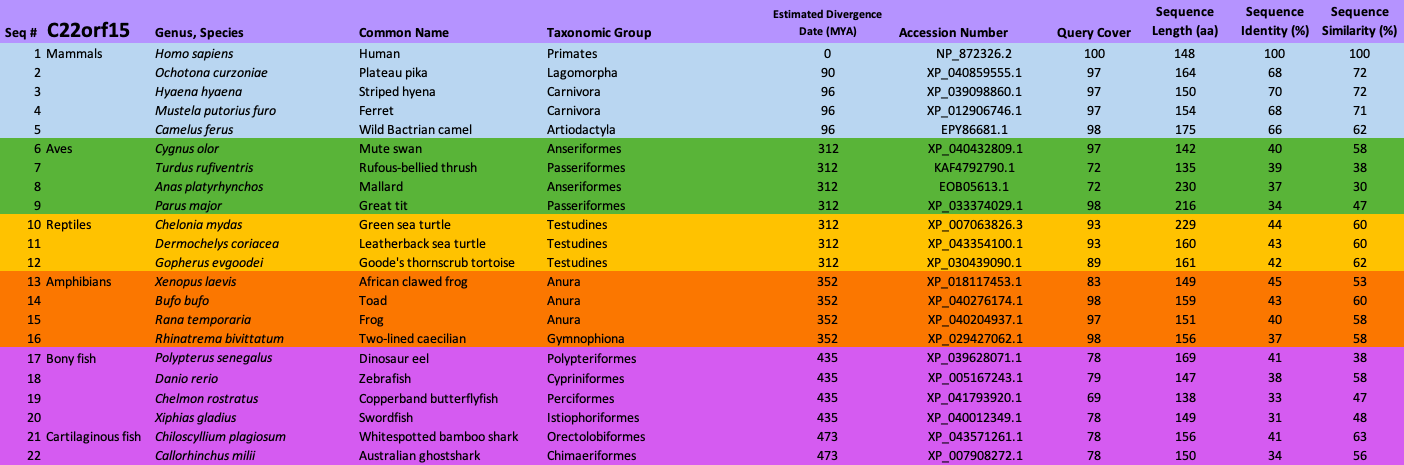
Table of C22orf15 Orthologs

== Evolution ==
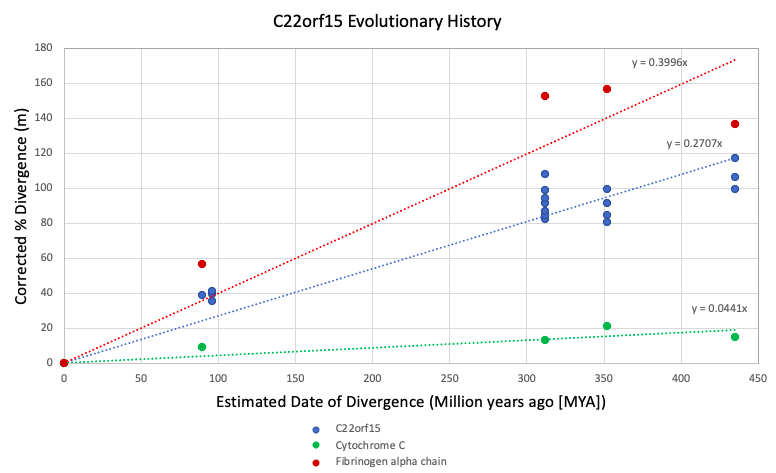
C22orf15 Evolutionary Rate

The slope of the trendline for C22orf15 more closely resembles the slope of the trendline for fibrinogen alpha chain, which evolves rapidly, as opposed to the slope of the trendline for cytochrome c, which evolves slowly. This signifies that C22orf15 is evolving rapidly, but not as rapidly as fibrinogen alpha chain.

C22orf15 Phylogeny

C22orf15 Phylogenetic Tree

== Clinical Significance ==
There appears to be a linkage between C22orf15 and both gastric and breast cancers. A copy number loss of DNA region 22q11.23, which includes C22orf15, has been linked to chromosomal instability (CIN)-positive aneuploid gastric cancer. DNA region 22q11.23 is also significantly more prevalent in basal-like BRCA1-mutated tumors compared to nonmutated wild-type BRCA1 tumors. Additionally, C22orf15 is highly differentially expressed in breast cancer cells compared to unaffected mammary epithelial cells.

Tetralogy of Fallot, a birth defect that alters normal blood flow through the heart, is a disease associated with C22orf15. Survival rate of Nasopharyngeal carcinoma has been found to negatively correlate with the expression of six specific genes, including C22orf15. C22orf15 has also been identified as one of the 40 novel protein biomarkers that are risk factors for incident atrial fibrillation.

=== Genetics ===
Phenotypes of patients with C22orf15 copy-number variants include intellectual disability, micrognathia, ventricular septal defect, and Tetralogy of Fallot.
