= Nutritious Rice for the World =

- Developers: Samudrala Computational Biology Group, University of Washington
- Release: 2008-5-12
- Platform: Cross-platform
- Type: Distributed computing
- Website: protinfo.compbio.washington.edu/rice

Nutritious Rice for the World is a World Community Grid research project in the field of agronomy led by the Samudrala Computational Biology Research Group at the University of Washington. It was launched on May 12, 2008. The objective of this project is to predict the structure of proteins of major strains of rice. The intent is to help farmers breed better rice strains with higher crop yields, promote greater disease and pest resistance, and utilize a full range of bioavailable nutrients that can benefit people around the world, especially in regions where malnutrition is a critical concern.

Determining the structure of proteins is an extremely difficult and expensive process. Though it is possible to computationally predict a protein's structure from its corresponding DNA sequence, there are thousands of distinct proteins found in rice. This presents a computational challenge that a single computer cannot solve within a reasonable timeframe.

Once the entire rice genome had been sequenced, the effort shifted to identifying genes that are involved in increased yield, disease resistance and nutritional value. This problem is made more difficult because very few cereal plants have been sequenced, and therefore, many of the rice genes do not resemble any genes of known function. The Computational Biology Research Group at the University of Washington developed the Protinfo software, which can produce protein structures at a fraction of the cost and time.

Protinfo is being used to create three-dimensional models of the tens of thousands of rice proteins. These models are then used to predict the function of each protein and to understand the role of the gene that encodes it. The models, and any analysis resulting from examining them, will be housed at the Bioverse database and webserver, which is a comprehensive framework to relate molecules such as proteins and DNA to an organism's pathways and systems.

Volunteers' computers on World Community Grid will run the Protinfo software to create models of all proteins encoded by the rice genome whose structure can be predicted reliably. These models will be analyzed to choose the best ones. From the resulting structures, prediction tools will determine the function of each protein and the role of the gene that encodes it. Using the power of Protinfo, World Community Grid will initially examine over 10,000 genes, and produce 100,000 models per gene.

Eventually, the structures of 30,000 to 60,000 proteins will be studied. Generating one billion models on the 320 CPU cluster at the Computational Biology Research Group was anticipated to take about 30 years to accomplish; however, using World Community Grid took only about two years working at 167 TFLOPS. The distributed computing function was suspended in April 2010 while in-house analysis of results continues. The DC function will resume when funding is secured for further phases.

The resulting knowledge base will hopefully lead to the development of improved hybrids of rice strains with higher yield, greater disease and pest resistance, and a full range of bioavailable nutrients. This knowledge can also be extended to other food crops such as wheat and maize.

== System Requirements ==
The project has minimum system requirements that the computer that does calculations for the project must comply to, which include:

- At least 128 MB RAM (with virtual memory enabled)
- 200 MB Hard Disk Drive with at least 50 MB available for use
- The ability to display 8-bit graphics at 640x480 resolution
- An Internet connection with minimum 28kbit/s speed
- Operating System: Windows 98, ME, 2000, XP, Vista, Linux, or Mac OS X using an Intel or PowerPC processor

== See also ==
- Grid computing
- World Community Grid
- Monte Carlo method
