= LiveBench =

LiveBench is a continuously running benchmark project for assessing the quality of protein structure prediction and secondary structure prediction methods. LiveBench focuses mainly on homology modeling and protein threading but also includes secondary structure prediction, comparing publicly available webserver output to newly deposited protein structures in the Protein Data Bank. Like the EVA project and unlike the related CASP and CAFASP experiments, LiveBench is intended to study the accuracy of predictions that would be obtained by non-expert users of publicly available prediction methods. A major advantage of LiveBench and EVA over CASP projects, which run once every two years, is their comparatively large data set.
