= Critical Assessment of Genome Interpretation =

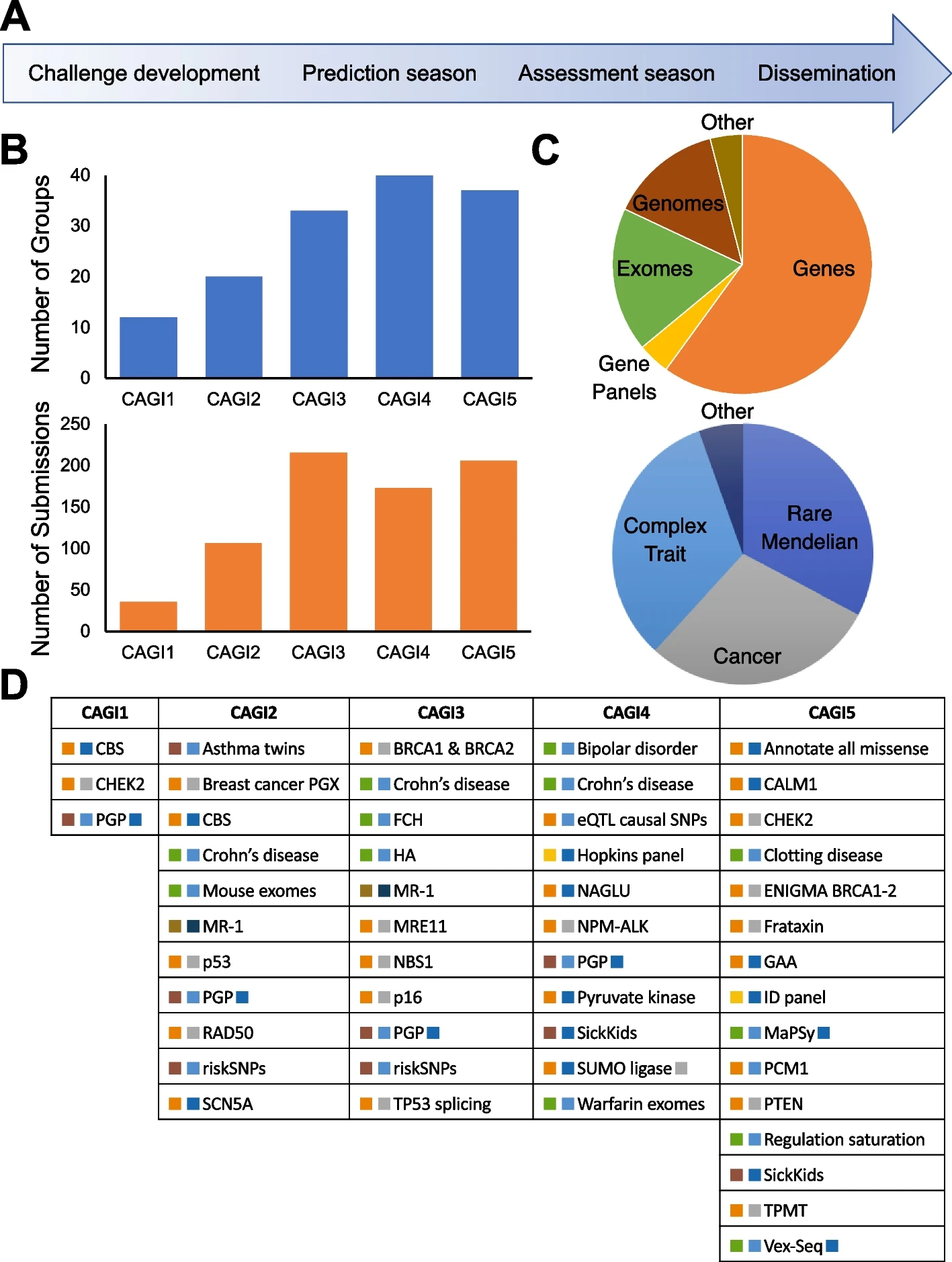
Overview of CAGI Competition

The Critical Assessment of Genome Interpretation (CAGI) is an annual bioinformatics competition focused on interpretation of genome variation. CAGI experiments are modeled on the protocols developed in the Critical Assessment of Structure Prediction (CASP) program, adapted to the genomics domain. Over a period of a decade CAGI has conducted five rounds of challenges, attracting 738 submissions from around the world. The results of which have been published in the journal Human Mutation.
