= EVA (benchmark) =

EVA was a continuously running benchmark project for assessing the quality and value of protein structure prediction and secondary structure prediction methods. Methods for predicting both secondary structure and tertiary structure - including homology modeling, protein threading, and contact order prediction - were compared to results from each week's newly solved protein structures deposited in the Protein Data Bank. The project aimed to determine the prediction accuracy that would be expected for non-expert users of common, publicly available prediction webservers; this is similar to the related LiveBench project and stands in contrast to the bi-yearly benchmark CASP, which aims to identify the maximum accuracy achievable by prediction experts.
