= Volume Area Dihedral Angle Reporter =

Content
- Description: Structure Validation Server

Contact
- Research center: University of Alberta and The Metabolomics Innovation Centre
- Laboratory: Dr. David Wishart

Access
- Data format: Data Input: PDB coordinate file(s); Data Output: Text and graphical data on protein structure features and quality
- Website: http://vadar.wishartlab.com/

Miscellaneous
- Data release frequency: Every 1-2 years with periodic corrections and updates
- Curation policy: Manually curated

Volume, Area, Dihedral Angle Reporter (VADAR) is a freely available protein structure validation web server that was developed as a collaboration between Dr. Brian Sykes and Dr. David Wishart at the University of Alberta. VADAR consists of over 15 different algorithms and programs for assessing and validating peptide and protein structures from their PDB coordinate data. VADAR is capable of determining secondary structure (using three different algorithms), identifying and classifying six different types of beta turns, determining and calculating the strength of C=O -- N-H hydrogen bonds, calculating residue-specific accessible surface areas (ASA), calculating residue volumes, determining backbone and side chain torsion angles (phi, psi, omega and chi angles), assessing local structure quality (through numerous quality indices), evaluating global structure quality, and identifying residue "outliers" (residues with unusual structural features). The results have been validated through extensive comparison to published data and careful visual inspection. VADAR produces both text and graphical output with most of the quantitative data presented in easily viewed tables. In particular, VADAR's output is presented in a vertical, tabular format with most of the sequence data, residue numbering and any other calculated property or feature presented from top to bottom, rather than from left to right.

== Identification of Secondary Structure ==
VADAR identifies and assigns protein secondary structure using 3 different algorithms. These three methods are then combined to create a consensus secondary structure assignment. Only 3 types of secondary structure are identified: Helices are indicated with an "H", beta-strands are indicated with a "B" and coil or unstructured regions are identified with a "C". Secondary structure assignments for each residue are listed under the column labeled SCND STRUC. The first secondary structure identification method (which appears in column 1) uses a geometric masking approach that was first described by Richards and Kundrot with slight modifications. The second method (which appears in column 2) uses backbone dihedral angles to identify secondary structure elements in a manner initially described by Levitt and Greer as well as Chou and Fasman. The third secondary structure identification method uses hydrogen bonding patterns (in association with measured dihedral angles) to identify helices, beta strands and coil regions. This third method is somewhat similar to the method originally described by Kabsch and Sander. The net result or consensus secondary structure is a weighted combination of each of the three methods. VADAR’s method of secondary structure identification generally identifies a higher fraction of secondary structure elements than the DSSP algorithm (64% helices and beta strands for VADAR versus 51% helices and beta strands for DSSP). In particular, VADAR’s secondary structure assignments appear to agree more closely with secondary structures identified by visual inspection (i.e. author assignments), by STRIDE (another secondary structure assignment algorithm) or via independent methods (i.e. NMR-based NOE methods).

== Calculation of Accessible Surface Area ==
Accessible surface areas is a measure of the solvent exposure of individual atoms or residues (measured in square Angstroms). It corresponds to the surface area of an atom (or residue) that a water molecule can access or touch. In VADAR, the accessible surface areas (ASA) for each residue is presented under two different column headers: RES ASA (residue ASA) and FRAC ASA (fractional ASA). The data listed under the RES ASA column refers to the “residue accessible surface areas” as measured in square Angstroms. The data listed under the FRAC ASA column refers to the fractional residue accessible surface areas (a value ranging from 0 to 1.0). Exposed, exterior, random coil or hydrophilic residues typically have a large fractional accessible surface areas (>0.5), while hydrophobic, beta sheet or interior residues have a small fractional accessible surface areas (<0.2). The fractional accessible surface areas is calculated by dividing a given residue’s observed accessible surface areas by the calculated accessible surface areas for that residue in an extended Gly-Xaa-Gly tripeptide (where Xaa is the residue of interest). VADAR reports accessible surface are values both for the entire amino acid residue and for the amino acid side chains. The accessible surface areas is also calculated for charged atoms (N, O), polar (N, O, S) atoms and for non-polar atoms (C). This information can be used to calculate charged, polar and non-polar surface area. Accessible surface areas measurements/estimates are particularly useful in protein structure assessment, protein structure validation and thermodynamic calculations. The values calculated for accessible surface areas (ASA) depend critically on the selection or choice of atomic or Van der Waals radii. Different methods and different authors have advocated the use of different atomic radii. As a result, VADAR provides several choices for atomic or Van der Waals radii.

== Calculation of Backbone and Side Chain Torsion Angles ==
Protein torsion angles are calculated for phi, psi, omega (which corresponds to the peptide bond) and chi1 (the first side chain torsion angle) using standard IUPAC definitions. These values are listed under four different column headers: PHI, PSI, OMEGA and CHI1. All torsion angles are reported in degrees. Torsion angles are a very useful indicator of the stereochemistry and the stereochemical quality of a protein structure, with most high-quality proteins exhibiting a relatively tight clustering of phi/psi angles and relatively little deviation in the omega angles.

== Determination of Beta Turns ==
Beta turns are another type of “short” or local secondary structure that is distinct from the more common helices, beta sheets or random coils. Beta turns are reasonably abundant (15%) and very important secondary structures in proteins. In particular, beta turns play a critical role in defining the topology of proteins. They also likely play a role in initiating early packing events during the protein folding process. In VADAR beta turns are identified under the BTURN header using standard Roman numeral notation (I = type I, II = type II, etc.). In VADAR, beta turns are identified using a combination of different pieces of information including hydrogen bond data, the location of previously identified secondary structures and the value of their local dihedral angles. In VADAR the classification and nomenclature used for beta turns follows the definitions proposed by Wilmot and Thornton.

== Calculation of Amino Acid Residue Volume ==
Because of the van der Waals force, atoms occupy space, which prevents other atoms from passing through each other. This 3D space or volume is called the excluded volume. Excluded volume is defined as the volume occupied by an atom or residue as determined by its atomic radii and its nearest neighbors. Excluded volume it is typically given in units of cubic Angstroms. In VADAR the excluded volume for each amino acid residue is listed under two different column headers: RES VOL (residue volume) and FRAC VOL (fractional volume). Residue volume is presented in cubic Angstraoms and calculated using the Voronoi polyhedra algorithm that was first introduced by Dr. Frederic Richards. In VADAR the number listed under the RES VOL header corresponds to the excluded volume (in cubic Angstroms) while the value under the FRAC VOL header corresponds to the fractional volume (which ranges from 0 to 1.0 or more). If a protein is efficiently packed, all of its residues should have fractional volumes close to 1.0 (+/- 0.1). In certain circumstances, if an amino acid residue is located in an interior cavity (or it has been placed improperly through poor refinement) it could have a fractional volume greater than 1.20. An amino acid residue located in a compressed region or a poorly refined region will have a fractional volume less than 0.80. Structural biologists often use excluded volume to help them find cavities, water-binding pockets, unexpected atomic overlaps or to identify problem areas in a protein structure. High quality protein structures should have relatively few residues with fractional volumes greater than 1.20 or less than 0.80.

== History ==
Initially released in 2002, the VADAR web server has gone through a number of revisions and updates (now in version 1.8). The latest version of the VADAR web server supports the submission of either PDB formatted files or PDB accession numbers and generates extensive tables and high quality graphs for quantitatively and qualitatively assessing protein structures determined by X-ray crystallography, NMR spectroscopy, 3D-threading or homology modelling. A separate website supports the analysis of multiple protein chains – as might be generated from a standard NMR structure determination effort.

== See also ==
- Crystallography
- DSSP (hydrogen bond estimation algorithm)
- Nuclear magnetic resonance
- Protein Structure Evaluation Suite & Server (PROSESS)
- Protein structure prediction
- Resolution by Proxy (ResProx)
- Root-mean-square deviation
- Structural bioinformatics
- Structure validation
