= Lists of bioinformatics software =

The list of bioinformatics software tools can be split up according to the license used:

- List of proprietary bioinformatics software
- List of open-source bioinformatics software

Alternatively, here is a categorization according to the respective bioinformatics subfield specialized on:

== Sequence analysis software ==
- List of sequence alignment software
- List of alignment visualization software
- Alignment-free sequence analysis
- De novo sequence assemblers
- List of gene prediction software
- List of disorder prediction software
- List of Protein subcellular localization prediction tools
- List of phylogenetics software
- List of phylogenetic tree visualization software

== Structural biology software ==
- List of molecular graphics systems
- List of protein-ligand docking software
- List of RNA structure prediction software
- List of software for protein model error verification
- List of systems biology modeling software
- List of protein secondary structure prediction programs
- List of protein structure prediction software
- Structural alignment software

== Other ==
- Compression of genomic sequencing data
- Bioinformatics workflow management system
- List of biomedical cybernetics software
- List of genetic engineering software
- List of systems biology visualization software
- List of systems biology modelling software
- List of mass spectrometry software

== See also ==
- Category:Molecular dynamics software
- Category:Metagenomics_software
