= Spectral signal-to-noise ratio =

Signal-to-noise measure used in imaging

In scientific imaging, the two-dimensional spectral signal-to-noise ratio (SSNR) is a signal-to-noise ratio measure which measures the normalised cross-correlation coefficient between several two-dimensional images over corresponding rings in Fourier space as a function of spatial frequency. It is a multi-particle extension of the Fourier ring correlation (FRC), which is related to the Fourier shell correlation. The SSNR is a popular method for finding the resolution of a class average in cryo-electron microscopy.

== Calculation ==
$$\mathrm{SSNR} (r)
=
\frac{\displaystyle\sum_{r_i \in R}\left|\sum_{k_i}{ F_{r_i,k} }\right|^2}
{\displaystyle \frac{K}{K-1} \sum_{r_i \in R}\sum_{k_i}{ \left|{ F_{r_i,k} - \bar{F}_{r_i}}\right|^2}} -1$$

where $F_{r_i,k}$ is the complex structure factor for image $k$ for a pixel $r_i$ at radius $R$. It is possible convert the SSNR into an equivalent FRC using the following formula:

$$\mathrm{FRC} = \frac{\mathrm{SSNR}}{\mathrm{SSNR} + 1}$$

== See also ==
- Resolution (electron density)
- Fourier shell correlation
