= List of software for protein model error verification =

This list of software for protein model error verification is a compilation of bioinformatics software frequently employed to check experimental and theoretical models of protein structures for errors.

NAME	Description	Methods	Link	Author
PROSESS - Protein Structure Evaluation Suite & Server			PROSESS
ResProx - resolution by proxy			ResProx
ANOLEA			ANOLEA
NQ-Flipper			NQ-Flipper
Prosa			ProSA
QMEAN			QMEAN
Verify3D			Verify3D
WHAT_CHECK			WHAT_CHECK	Gert Vriend
