= HSE =

HSE may refer to: Health, Safety and Environment

== Organisations ==
- Health and Safety Executive, regulation and enforcement of workplace health, safety and welfare agency in the UK
- Health Service Executive, provision of health and personal social services in the Republic of Ireland
- Health and Safety Executive for Northern Ireland, health body of Northern Ireland
- Holding Slovenske elektrarne, a Slovene power company

=== Education ===
- Hamilton Southeastern Schools, the primary school system in Fishers, Indiana, US
  - Hamilton Southeastern High School, a public high school
- Helsinki School of Economics, Finland
- Higher School of Economics, Moscow, Russia

=== Stock exchanges ===
- Hyderabad Stock Exchange

== Science and technology ==
- Half sphere exposure, a protein solvent exposure measure
- Heyd-Scuseria-Ernzerhof functional, in computational quantum mechanical modelling
- Hydrostatic equilibrium, in fluid mechanics
- Higher Speed Ethernet, in computer networking
- Highly Siderophile element, in planetary geology

=== Health and medicine ===
- Health, safety and environment, a discipline focused on regulation and enforcement of workplace health, safety, environmental issues, and welfare in some countries
- Health Survey for England, a statistical survey
- Herpes simplex encephalitis, a viral infection

== Other uses ==
- Human systems engineering, in systems psychology
- Billy Mitchell Airport, Cape Hatteras, North Carolina, United States, IATA and FAA LID code HSE
- High Specification Equipment, a trim level for Range Rover
- Home Sports Entertainment, a cable sports TV channel that was the forerunner of Fox Sports Southwest
