= Solvent exposure =

Physical contact with a solvent

Solvent exposure occurs when a chemical, material, or person comes into contact with a solvent. Chemicals can be dissolved in solvents, materials such as polymers can be broken down chemically by solvents, and people can develop certain ailments from exposure to solvents both organic and inorganic.

Some common solvents include acetone, methanol, tetrahydrofuran, dimethylsulfoxide, and water among countless others.

In biology, the solvent exposure of an amino acid in a protein measures to what extent the amino acid is accessible to the solvent (usually water) surrounding the protein. Generally speaking, hydrophobic amino acids will be buried inside the protein and thus shielded from the solvent, while hydrophilic amino acids will be close to the surface and thus exposed to the solvent. However, as with many biological rules exceptions are common and hydrophilic residues are frequently found to be buried in the native structure and vice versa.

Solvent exposure can be numerically described by several measures, the most popular measures being accessible surface area and relative accessible surface area. Other measures are for example:

- Contact number: number of amino acid neighbors within a sphere around the amino acid.
- Residue depth: distance of the amino acid to the molecular surface.
- Half sphere exposure: number of amino acid neighbors within two half spheres around the amino acid.
