= Residue depth =

Residue depth (RD) is a solvent exposure measure that describes to what extent a residue is buried in the protein structure space. It complements the information provided by conventional accessible surface area (ASA).

Currently, predictions in regards to whether a residue is exposed or buried are used in a wide variety of protein structure prediction engines. Such prediction can provide valuable information for protein fold recognition, functional residue prediction and protein drug design. Several biophysical properties of proteins have been shown to correlate with residue depth, including mutant protein stability, protein-protein interface hot-spot, H/D exchange rate of residue and residue conservation.

Residue depth has also been utilized in predicting small molecule binding site on proteins, with accuracy statistically on par with other conventional methods. The method has the advantageous of being simple and intuitive. The method has been reported to detect unconventional flat binding sites.

To date several approaches have been proposed to predict RD values from protein sequences. Yuan and Wang proposed a computational framework that uses sequential evolutionary information contained in PSI-BLAST profiles and the global protein size information to quantify the relationship between RD and protein sequence. Zhang et al. proposed the RDpred method to predict RD values based on predicted secondary structure, residue position and PSI-BLAST profile. More recently, Song et al. described another sequence-based method that also uses support vector regression to quantify the RD-sequence relationship. Their webserver Prodepth, is developed to facilitate RD prediction analysis for sequences submitted by interested users. In addition, Prodepth server can predict the solvent-accessible surface area (ASA) value for each residue for users' submitted sequence. Based on the predicted ASA and RD values, it will further output the two-state solvent accessibility prediction by classifying a residue as being exposed or buried.

Currently, residue depth has been used for several applications. One of these is predicting the pKa of an ionizable group. The pKa equation is a linear combination of a few features, including: depth, number of hydrogen bond, electrostatic energy, solvent accessible surface area. Among these features, depth has a major contribution.
