= Kuan Wang =

Taiwanese biochemist

- 王寬
- Born: September 9, 1945 (age 80)
- Education: National Taiwan University (BS); Yale University (PhD)
- Scientific career
- Fields: Molecular biophysics Biochemistry
- Workplaces: University of Texas at Austin; Taipei Medical University
- Doctoral advisor: Frederic M. Richards

Kuan Wang (Chinese: 王寬; born September 9, 1945) is a Taiwanese biochemist known for his contributions to muscle biochemistry and cell biology. He has an h-index of 54.

== Education ==
After graduating with a Bachelor of Science (B.S.) in chemistry from National Taiwan University, Wang came to the United States for graduate study and earned a Ph.D. in molecular biophysics and biochemistry from Yale University in 1974 under the guidance of Frederic M. Richards. He was an NIH postdoctoral fellow (1974–1976) at the University of California, San Diego, in the laboratory of S. J. Singer.

== Career ==
In 1977 he joined the Department of Chemistry at the University of Texas at Austin as assistant professor. During his early years at UT, Wang and his co-workers discovered two previously unrecognized high molecular weight proteins of myofibrils, Titin and Nebulin, which fundamentally changed our understanding of muscle sarcomeres.

At UT Wang was promoted to associate professor in 1984 and professor in 1989. During this period, Wang and his coworkers extended and ramified their findings on the structures of Titin and Nebulin and how they function within the sarcomere.

In 1997, Wang moved to the National Institutes of Health where he became Chief of the Laboratory of Physical Biology in the National Institute of Arthritis, Musculoskeletal and Skin Diseases, then becoming Chief of the Laboratory of Muscle Biology in 2002. At NIH, Wang's interests and responsibilities broadened to include a broad range of biophysical methods and nanomedicine.

In 2011, after retiring from the NIH, Wang returned to Taiwan where he served Academia Sinica in several capacities, including Director of the Chemistry Institute, Distinguished Research Fellow in Biological Chemistry, and Director of the Nanomedicine Program until amyotrophic lateral sclerosis forced his retirement. Despite his physical disability, Wang continues to hold (2015-) a University Chair Professorship in the College of Biomedical Engineering of Taipei Medical University through which he continues to mentor young scientists and to collaborate in ongoing research.

== Honors ==
In 2004, Wang was elected an academician of Academia Sinica, and a fellow of The World Academy of Sciences in 2012.

== Highly cited papers ==
Articles with more than 300 citations according to Google Scholar as of April 12, 2022

Wang, K.; McClure, J.; Tu, A. (1979) "Titin: major myofibrillar components of striated muscle," Proceedings of the National Academy of Sciences 76 (8): 3698-3702. DOI:10.1073/pnas.76.8.3698

Wang, K.; Richards, F. M. (1974) "An approach to nearest neighbor analysis of membrane proteins," Journal of Biological Chemistry 249 (24): 8005-8018. DOI:10.1016/s0021-9258(19)42065-6

Wang, K.; Ash, J. F.; Singer, S. J. (1975). "Filamin, a new high-molecular-weight protein found in smooth muscle and non-muscle cells," Proceedings of the National Academy of Sciences 72 (11) 4483-4486. DOI:10.1073/pnas.72.11.4483

Wang, K.; McCarter, R.; Wright, J.; Beverly, J.; Ramirez-Mitchell, R. (1991). "Regulation of skeletal muscle stiffness and elasticity by titin isoforms: a test of the segmental extension model of resting tension," Proceedings of the National Academy of Sciences 88 (16): 7101-7105. DOI:10.1073/pnas.88.16.7101

Liu, P. Y.; Chin, L. K.; Ser, W.; Chen, H. F.; Hsieh, C. M.; Lee, C. H.; Sung, K. B.; Ayi, T. C.; Yap, P. H.; Liedberg, B.; Wang, K.; Bourouina, T.; Leprince-Wang, Y. (2016) "Cell refractive index for cell biology and disease diagnosis: past, present and future," Lab on a Chip 16 (4): 634-644. DOI:10.1039/c5lc01445j

Wang, K.; McCarter, R.; Wright, J.; Beverly, J.; Ramirez-Mitchell, R. (1993). "Viscoelasticity of the sarcomere matrix of skeletal muscles. The titin-myosin composite filament is a dual-stage molecular spring," Biophysical Journal 64 (4): 1161-1177. DOI:10.1016/S0006-3495(93)81482-6

Wang, K.; Wright, J. (1988). "Architecture of the sarcomere matrix of skeletal muscle: immunoelectron microscopic evidence that suggests a set of parallel inextensible nebulin filaments anchored at the Z line," Journal of Cell Biology 107 (6): 2199-2212. DOI:10.1083/jcb.107.6.2199
