= Wendell Lim =

American biochemist

- Education: Harvard University, Massachusetts Institute of Technology
- Scientific career
- Fields: Bioengineering
- Workplaces: University of California, San Francisco
- Academic advisors: Fred Richards

Wendell Lim is an American biochemist who is the Byer's Distinguished Professor of Cellular and Molecular Pharmacology at the University of California, San Francisco. He is the director of the UCSF Cell Design Institute. He earned his A.B. in chemistry from Harvard University working with Jeremy Knowles on enzyme evolutionary optimization. He obtained his Ph.D. in biochemistry and biophysics from Massachusetts Institute of Technology under the guidance of Bob Sauer using genetic and biophysical approaches to understand the role of hydrophobic core interactions in protein folding. He then did his postdoctoral work with Frederic Richards at Yale University on the structure of protein interaction domains. Lim's work has focused on cell signaling, synthetic biology, and cell engineering, particularly in immune cells.

== Research career ==
=== Modular Signaling Proteins ===
Lim's research has focused on mechanisms of cell signaling – how cells sense their environment and process this information to make complex functional decisions. He began his career studying the structure and function of modular signaling domains and scaffold proteins, but became increasingly interested in the general question of how modularity plays a role in the evolution of new signaling circuits and networks.

=== Synthetic and Systems Biology ===
Lim has been a pioneer in the fields of synthetic and systems biology, asking how rewiring cellular regulatory circuits can be used to understand fundamental design principles of biological systems. He showed that signaling proteins and pathways could be functionally rewired in living cells using altered protein interaction domains, scaffold proteins, and modular allosteric interactions. He helped pioneer the use of optogenetic response modules as a way to exert control of intracellular signaling and its use in profiling how cells respond to temporal patterns of stimulation. He has also worked on identifying common regulatory network modules that perform fundamental cellular functions such as amplification, adaptation, spatial self-organization, polarized cell movement, and temporal sensing. He has been applying these approaches to engineer and understand immune cell function as well as multicellular self-organization (synthetic development).

=== Engineering therapeutic immune cells ===
Lim has been a leader in the application of synthetic biology approaches to immune cell engineering and cell therapy development, advocating approaches for predictively engineering cells with precision therapeutic functions to treat cancer and other complex diseases. His group was the first to develop small molecule gated chimeric antigen receptors (CARs) as well as the highly flexible synthetic Notch (synNotch) receptor platform for programming novel transcriptional control circuits. His group has shown how these components can be used to design T cell circuits that achieve precision combinatorial antigen detection and killing of cancer (synNotch to CAR circuits). His group has also engineered T cells to recognize specific target tissues, and to deliver genetically encoded therapeutic payloads to these sites. In addition, Lim's group has used these synthetic receptors to design positive feedback circuits for sensing antigen density with non-linear thresholds.

Lim was part of the team that invented the CRISPRi system that used modular DNA targeting of inactive Cas9 to control the transcription of specific endogenous genes. He has also been engineering multicellular networks that drive specific formation of complex self-organizing tissue-like structures. Lim and colleagues have advocated applying cell engineering approaches to many other complex diseases besides cancer, as well as using engineered cells as research tools for probing and perturbing cell and tissue regulatory networks.

== Biotech industry ==
Lim's work in immune cell engineering led to the founding of the early cell therapy engineering company Cell Design Labs in 2015, which was acquired by Gilead Sciences in 2017.

== Science education and outreach ==
Lim co-authored the textbook Cell Signaling with colleagues Bruce Mayer and Tony Pawson. His group has also participated in the synthetic biology outreach program iGEM with San Francisco Bay Area high school students and teachers. He has also conducted creative projects on design thinking, as well as science and cooking.

== Personal life ==
Lim is Chinese-American and grew up in Chicago, where he graduated from the University of Chicago Laboratory Schools. He currently lives in San Francisco with his wife and children. Lim is an avid basketball player, surfer, and artist.

== Awards and service ==
- Vienna Center for Molecular Medicine, Landsteiner Lecture (2021)
- University of Oregon, Streisinger Lecture (2020)
- German Biochemical Society, Feodor Lynden Award (2019)
- NIH Transformative R01 ('Re-Designing the T cell') (2014)
- Wired Magazine, 50 people who will change the world (2012)
- Howard Hughes Medical Institute Investigator (2008–2020)
- Protein Society Hans Neurath Award (2010)
- Westinghouse Science Talent Search Finalist (1982)
- Editorial Board, Science Magazine
- Editorial Board, Cell
- Burroughs Wellcome Fund, Board of Directors
