= Relative accessible surface area =

Relative accessible surface area or relative solvent accessibility (RSA) of a protein residue is a measure of residue solvent exposure. It can be calculated by formula:

$\text{RSA} = \text{ASA} / \text{MaxASA}$

where ASA is the solvent accessible surface area and MaxASA is the maximum possible solvent accessible surface area for the residue. Both ASA and MaxASA are commonly measured in ${\AA}^2$.

To measure the relative solvent accessibility of the residue side-chain only, one usually takes MaxASA values that have been obtained from Gly-X-Gly tripeptides, where X is the residue of interest. Several MaxASA scales have been published and are commonly used (see Table).

Residue	Tien et al. 2013 (theor.)	Tien et al. 2013 (emp.)	Miller et al. 1987	Rose et al. 1985
Alanine	129.0	121.0	113.0	118.1
Arginine	274.0	265.0	241.0	256.0
Asparagine	195.0	187.0	158.0	165.5
Aspartate	193.0	187.0	151.0	158.7
Cysteine	167.0	148.0	140.0	146.1
Glutamate	223.0	214.0	183.0	186.2
Glutamine	225.0	214.0	189.0	193.2
Glycine	104.0	97.0	85.0	88.1
Histidine	224.0	216.0	194.0	202.5
Isoleucine	197.0	195.0	182.0	181.0
Leucine	201.0	191.0	180.0	193.1
Lysine	236.0	230.0	211.0	225.8
Methionine	224.0	203.0	204.0	203.4
Phenylalanine	240.0	228.0	218.0	222.8
Proline	159.0	154.0	143.0	146.8
Serine	155.0	143.0	122.0	129.8
Threonine	172.0	163.0	146.0	152.5
Tryptophan	285.0	264.0	259.0	266.3
Tyrosine	263.0	255.0	229.0	236.8
Valine	174.0	165.0	160.0	164.5

In this table, the more recently published MaxASA values (from Tien et al. 2013) are systematically larger than the older values (from Miller et al. 1987 or Rose et al. 1985). This discrepancy can be traced back to the conformation in which the Gly-X-Gly tripeptides are evaluated to calculate MaxASA. The earlier works used the extended conformation, with backbone angles of $\phi=-120^\circ$ and $\psi=140^\circ$. However, Tien et al. 2013 demonstrated that tripeptides in extended conformation fall among the least-exposed conformations. The largest ASA values are consistently observed in alpha helices, with backbone angles around $\phi=-50^\circ$ and $\psi=-45^\circ$. Tien et al. 2013 recommend to use their theoretical MaxASA values (2nd column in Table), as they were obtained from a systematic enumeration of all possible conformations and likely represent a true upper bound to observable ASA.

ASA and hence RSA values are generally calculated from a protein structure, for example with the software DSSP. However, there is also an extensive literature attempting to predict RSA values from sequence data, using machine-learning approaches.

== Prediction tools ==
Experimentally predicting RSA is an expensive and time-consuming task. In recent decades, several computational methods have been introduced for RSA prediction.
