= Structure validation =

Process of evaluating 3-dimensional atomic models of biomacromolecules

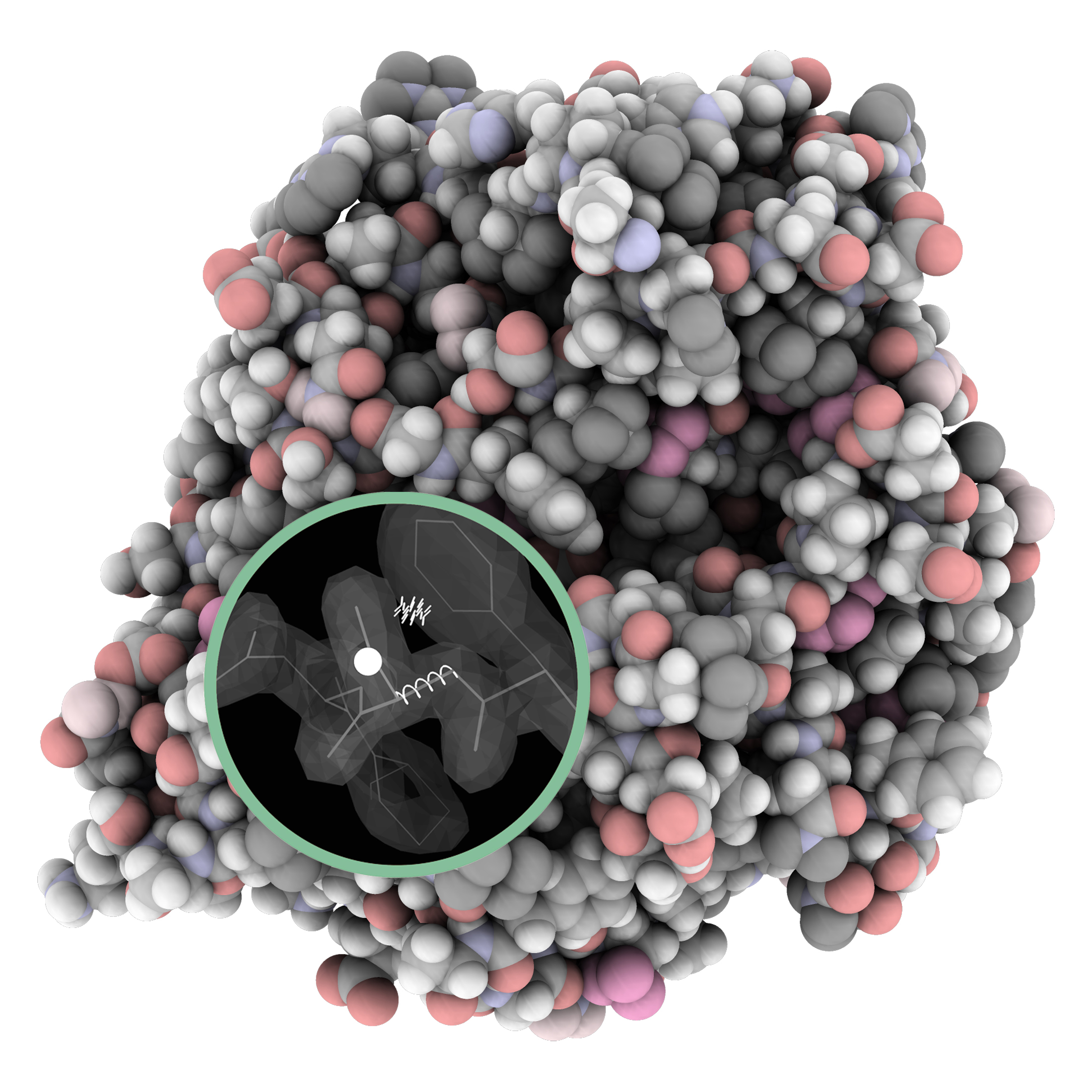
Structure validation concept: model of a protein (each ball is an atom), and magnified region with electron density data and 3 bright flags for problems

Macromolecular structure validation is the process of evaluating reliability for 3-dimensional atomic models of large biological molecules such as proteins and nucleic acids. These models, which provide 3D coordinates for each atom in the molecule (see example in the image), come from structural biology experiments such as x-ray crystallography or nuclear magnetic resonance (NMR). The validation has three aspects: 1) checking on the validity of the thousands to millions of measurements in the experiment; 2) checking how consistent the atomic model is with those experimental data; and 3) checking consistency of the model with known physical and chemical properties.

Proteins and nucleic acids are the building blocks of biology, providing the necessary chemical reactions, structural organization, growth, mobility, reproduction, and environmental sensitivity. The 3D structures of the molecules and the changes in those structures determine their biological functions. To understand and control those functions, accurate knowledge is needed about the models that represent those structures, including their strengths and weaknesses.

End-users of macromolecular models include clinicians, teachers and students, as well as the structural biologists themselves, journal editors and referees, experimentalists studying the macromolecules by other techniques, and theoreticians and bioinformaticians studying more general properties of biological molecules. Their interests and requirements vary, but all benefit greatly from a global and local understanding of the reliability of the models.

== Historical summary ==
Macromolecular crystallography was preceded by the older field of small-molecule x-ray crystallography (for structures with less than a few hundred atoms). Small-molecule diffraction data extends to much higher resolution than feasible for macromolecules, and has a very clean mathematical relationship between the data and the atomic model. The residual, or R-factor, measures the agreement between the experimental data and the values back-calculated from the atomic model. For a well-determined small-molecule structure the R-factor is nearly as small as the uncertainty in the experimental data (well under 5%). Therefore, that one test by itself provides most of the validation needed, but a number of additional consistency and methodology checks are done by automated software as a requirement for small-molecule crystal structure papers submitted to the International Union of Crystallography (IUCr) journals such as Acta Crystallographica section B or C. Atomic coordinates of these small-molecule structures are archived and accessed through the Cambridge Structural Database (CSD) or the Crystallography Open Database (COD).

The first macromolecular validation software was developed around 1990, for proteins. It included Rfree cross-validation for model-to-data match, bond length and angle parameters for covalent geometry, and sidechain and backbone conformational criteria. For macromolecular structures, the atomic models are deposited in the Protein Data Bank (PDB), still the single archive of this data. The PDB was established in the 1970s at Brookhaven National Laboratory, moved in 2000 to the RCSB (Research Collaboration for Structural Biology) centered at Rutgers, and expanded in 2003 to become the wwPDB (worldwide Protein Data Bank), with access sites added in Europe () and Asia (), and with NMR data handled at the BioMagResBank (BMRB) in Wisconsin.

Validation rapidly became standard in the field, with further developments described below. *Obviously needs expansion*

A large boost was given to the applicability of comprehensive validation for both x-ray and NMR as of February 1, 2008, when the worldwide Protein Data Bank (wwPDB) made mandatory the deposition of experimental data along with atomic coordinates. Since 2012 strong forms of validation have been in the process of being adopted for wwPDB deposition from recommendations of the wwPDB Validation Task Force committees for x-ray crystallography, for NMR, for SAXS (small-angle x-ray scattering), and for cryoEM (cryo-Electron Microscopy).

== Stages of validation ==
Validations can be broken into three stages: validating the raw data collected (data validation), the interpretation of the data into the atomic model (model-to-data validation), and finally validation on the model itself. While the first two steps are specific to the technique used, validating the arrangement of atoms in the final model is not.

=== Model validation ===
==== Conformation (dihedrals): protein & RNA ====
The backbone and side-chain dihedral angles of protein and RNA have been shown to have specific combinations of angles which are allowed (or forbidden). For protein backbone dihedrals (φ, ψ), this has been addressed by the legendary Ramachandran Plot while for side-chain dihedrals (χ's), one should refer to the Dunbrack Backbone-dependent rotamer library.

Though, mRNA structures are generally short-lived and single-stranded, there are an abundance of non-coding RNAs with different secondary and tertiary folding (tRNA, rRNA etc.) which contain a preponderance of the canonical Watson-Crick (WC) base-pairs, together with significant number of non-Watson Crick (NWC) base-pairs - for which such RNA also qualify for regular structural validation that apply for nucleic acid helices. The standard practice is to analyse the intra- (Transnational: Shift, Slide, Rise; Rotational: Tilt, Roll, Twist) and inter-base-pair geometrical parameters (Transnational: Shear, Stagger, Stretch, Rotational: Buckle, Propeller, Opening) - whether in-range or out-of-range with respect to their suggested values. These parameters describe the relative orientations of the two paired bases with respect to each other in two strands (intra) along with those of the two stacked base pairs (inter) with respect to each other, and, hence, together, they serve to validate nucleic acid structures in general. Since, RNA-helices are small in length (average: 10-20 bps), the use of electrostatic surface potential as a validation parameter has been found to be beneficial, particularly for modelling purposes.

==== Packing and Electrostatics: globular proteins ====
For globular proteins, interior atomic packing (arising from short-range, local interactions) of side-chains has been shown to be pivotal in the structural stabilization of the protein-fold. On the other hand, the electrostatic harmony (non-local, long-range) of the overall fold has also been shown to be essential for its stabilization. Packing anomalies include steric clashes, short contacts, holes and cavities while electrostatic disharmony refer to unbalanced partial charges in the protein core (particularly relevant for designed protein interiors). While the clash-score of Molprobity identifies steric clashes at a very high resolution, the Complementarity Plot combines packing anomalies with electrostatic imbalance of side-chains and signals for either or both.

==== Carbohydrates ====
A 2D diagram of an N-glycan linked to an antibody fragment in the structure with PDB accession code '4BYH'. This diagram, which has been generated with Privateer, follows the standard symbol nomenclature and includes, in its original svg format, annotations containing validation information, including ring conformation and detected monosaccharide types.

The branched and cyclic nature of carbohydrates poses particular problems to structure validation tools. At higher resolutions, it is possible to determine the sequence/structure of oligo- and poly-saccharides, both as covalent modifications and as ligands. However, at lower resolutions (typically lower than 2.0Å), sequences/structures should either match known structures, or be supported by complementary techniques such as Mass Spectrometry. Also, monosaccharides have clear conformational preferences (saturated rings are typically found in chair conformations), but errors introduced during model building and/or refinement (wrong linkage chirality or distance, or wrong choice of model - see for recommendations on carbohydrate model building and refinement and for reviews on general errors in carbohydrate structures) can bring their atomic models out of the more likely low-energy state. Around 20% of the deposited carbohydrate structures are in a higher-energy conformation not justified by the structural data (measured using real-space correlation coefficient).

A number of carbohydrate validation web services are available at glycosciences.de (including nomenclature checks and linkage checks by pdb-care, and cross-validation with Mass Spectrometry data through the use of GlycanBuilder), whereas the CCP4 suite currently distributes Privateer, which is a tool that is integrated into the model building and refinement process itself. Privateer is able to check stereo- and regio-chemistry, ring conformation and puckering, linkage torsions, and real-space correlation against positive omit density, generating aperiodic torsion restraints on ring bonds, which can be used by any refinement software in order to maintain the monosaccharide's minimal energy conformation.

Privateer also generates scalable two-dimensional SVG diagrams according to the Essentials of Glycobiology standard symbol nomenclature containing all the validation information as tooltip annotations (see figure). This functionality is currently integrated into other CCP4 programs, such as the molecular graphics program CCP4mg (through the Glycoblocks 3D representation, which conforms to the standard symbol nomenclature) and the suite's graphical interface, CCP4i2.

== Validation for crystallography ==
=== Overall considerations ===
==== Global vs local criteria ====
Many evaluation criteria apply globally to an entire experimental structure, most notably the resolution, the anisotropy or incompleteness of the data, and the residual or R-factor that measures overall model-to-data match (see below). Those help a user choose the most accurate among related Protein Data Bank entries to answer their questions. Other criteria apply to individual residues or local regions in the 3D structure, such as fit to the local electron density map or steric clashes between atoms. Those are especially valuable to the structural biologist for making improvements to the model, and to the user for evaluating the reliability of that model right around the place they care about - such as a site of enzyme activity or drug binding. Both types of measures are very useful, but although global criteria are easier to state or publish, local criteria make the greatest contribution to scientific accuracy and biological relevance. As expressed in the Rupp textbook, "Only local validation, including assessment of both geometry and electron density, can give an accurate picture of the reliability of the structure model or any hypothesis based on local features of the model."

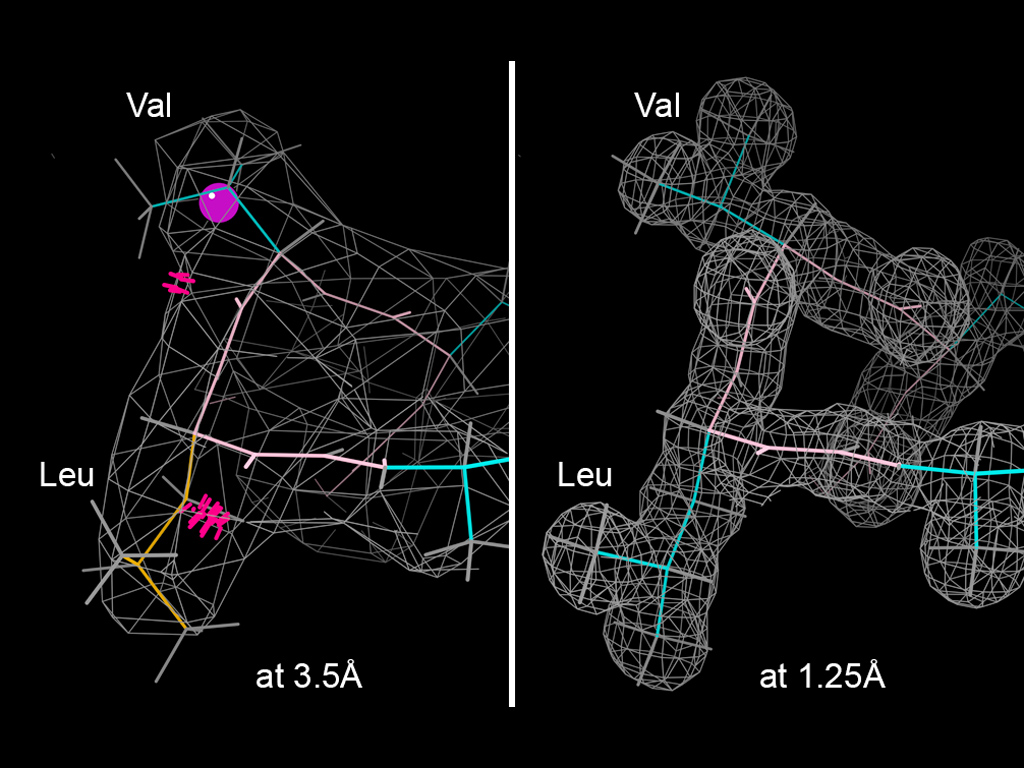
What can be seen in low vs high resolution macromolecular crystal structures

== In nuclear magnetic resonance ==
=== Data Validation: Chemical Shifts, NOEs, RDCs ===
AVS
Assignment validation suite (AVS) checks the chemical shifts list in BioMagResBank (BMRB) format for problems.
PSVS
Protein Structure Validation Server at the NESG based on information retrieval statistics
PROSESS
PROSESS (Protein Structure Evaluation Suite & Server) is a new web server that offers an assessment of protein structural models by NMR chemical shifts as well as NOEs, geometrical, and knowledge-based parameters.
LACS
Linear analysis of chemical shifts is used for absolute referencing of chemical shift data.

=== Model-to-data validation ===
TALOS+. Predicts protein backbone torsion angles from chemical shift data. Frequently used to generate further restraints applied to a structure model during refinement.

=== Model validation: as above ===
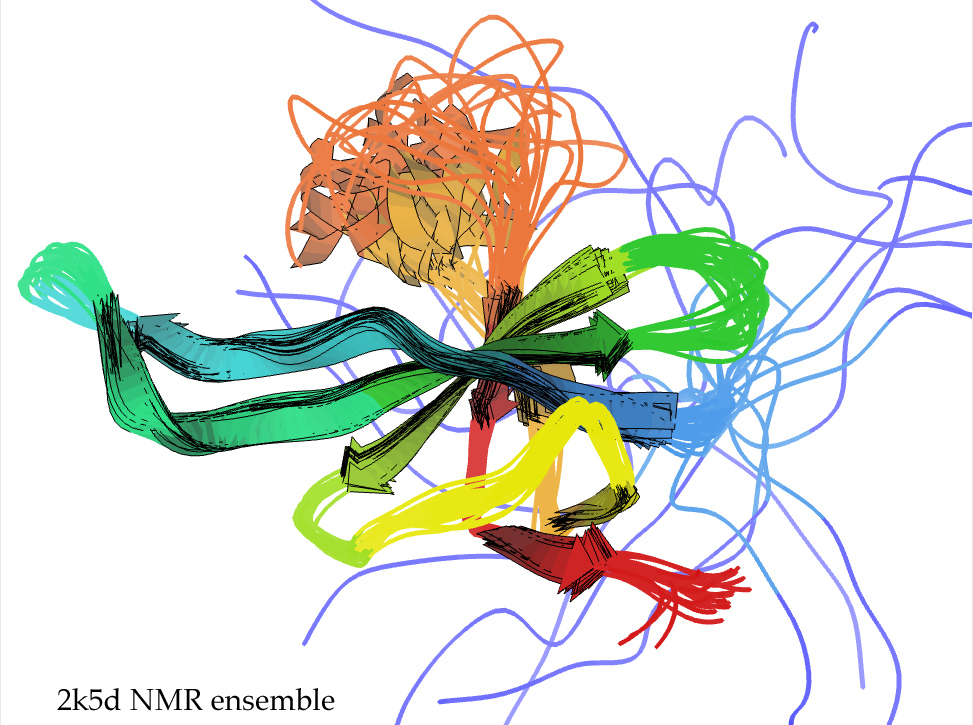
NMR structural ensemble for PDB file 2K5D, with well-defined structure for the beta strands (arrows) and undefined, presumably highly mobile regions for the orange loop and the blue N-terminus

=== Dynamics: core vs loops, tails, and mobile domains ===
One of the critical needs for NMR structural ensemble validation is to distinguish well-determined regions (those that have experimental data) from regions that are highly mobile and/or have no observed data. There are several current or proposed methods for making this distinction such as Random Coil Index, but so far the NMR community has not standardized on one.

== In cryo-EM ==
Cyro-EM presents special challenges to model-builders as the observed electron density is frequently insufficient to resolve individual atoms, leading to a higher likelihood of errors.

Geometry-based validation tools similar to those used in X-ray crystallography can be used to highlight implausible modeling choices and guide modeler toward more native-like structures. The CaBLAM method, which only uses Cα atoms, is suitable for low-resolution structures from cyro-EM.

A way to compute the difference density map has been formulated for cyro-EM. Cross-validation using a "free" map, comparable to the use of a free R-factor, is also available. Other methods for checking model-map fit include correlation coefficients, model-map FSC, confidence maps, CryoEF (orientation bias check), and TEMPy SMOC.

== In SAXS ==
SAXS (small-angle x-ray scattering) is a rapidly growing area of structure determination, both as a source of approximate 3D structure for initial or difficult cases and as a component of hybrid-method structure determination when combined with NMR, EM, crystallographic, cross-linking, or computational information. There is great interest in the development of reliable validation standards for SAXS data interpretation and for quality of the resulting models, but there are as yet no established methods in general use. Three recent steps in this direction are the creation of a Small-Angle Scattering Validation Task Force committee by the worldwide Protein DataBank and its initial report, a set of suggested standards for data inclusion in publications, and an initial proposal of statistically derived criteria for automated quality evaluation.

== For computational biology ==
It is difficult to do meaningful validation of an individual, purely computational, macromolecular model in the absence of experimental data for that molecule, because the model with the best geometry and conformational score may not be the one closest to the right answer. Therefore, much of the emphasis in validation of computational modeling is in assessment of the methods. To avoid bias and wishful thinking, double-blind prediction competitions have been organized, the original example of which (held every 2 years since 1994) is CASP (Critical Assessment of Structure Prediction) to evaluate predictions of 3D protein structure for newly solved crystallographic or NMR structures held in confidence until the end of the relevant competition. The major criterion for CASP evaluation is a weighted score called GDT-TS for the match of Calpha positions between the predicted and the experimental models.

== See also ==
- List of biophysically important macromolecular crystal structures
