= Protein Structure Evaluation Suite & Server =

System for validating protein structures

PROSESS
Content
- Description: Protein Structure Evaluation Suite & Server
- Data types captured: X-ray or NMR coordinates (PDB format)

Contact
- Research center: University of Alberta
- Laboratory: Dr. David Wishart
- Primary citation: PROSESS: a protein structure evaluation suite and server.

Access
- Website: http://www.prosess.ca

PROSESS home page

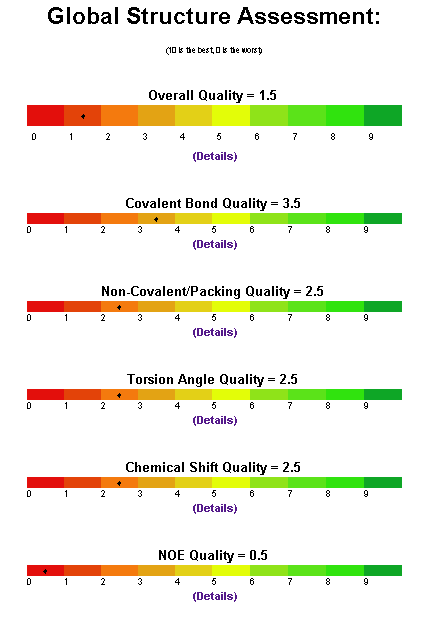
PROSESS overall and category quality indices on the main result page

Protein Structure Evaluation Suite & Server (PROSESS) is a freely available web server for protein structure validation. It has been designed at the University of Alberta to assist with the process of evaluating and validating protein structures solved by NMR spectroscopy.

== Structure validation ==
Structure validation is a particularly important component of the structure determination pipeline as many protein structures have small structural errors (i.e. distorted bond lengths or angles, incompatible torsion angles, overlapping atoms) that are not easily detected by visual inspection. For protein structures solved by NMR spectroscopy, where large numbers of structures are generated and where coordinate inaccuracies are common, this problem is particularly acute.

== Methodology ==
Most NMR-based structure validation protocols primarily use NOE (Nuclear Overhauser Enhancement), J-coupling or residual dipolar coupling (RDC ) data to assess or validate structures. In particular, they try to assess the agreement between the experimentally observed and the calculated NOEs, RDCs and/or J-couplings. Good agreement between the calculated and observed parameters normally indicates a good structure. Other methods for structure validation (such as ProCheck, MolProbity, ResProx and VADAR) focus on measuring coordinate data, rather than experimental data, to assess the quality of the bond or torsion angle geometry. PROSESS is unique among structure validation servers in that it evaluates both coordinate quality and experimental data quality.

PROSESS is also able to use NMR chemical shifts (as well as NOEs) to assess or validate protein structures. Chemical shifts are easily and very precisely measurable NMR observables that provide a great deal of information about protein structure and dynamics (see Protein Chemical Shift Prediction). Specifically, PROSESS assesses the agreement between observed chemical shifts and ShiftX-predicted HA, CA, CB, N, C, and HN NMR chemical shifts.

In addition to its ability to validate structures using chemical shifts, PROSESS also checks many other protein structure parameters including covalent bond quality, non-covalent bond and atomic packing quality, torsion angle quality and NOE quality (i.e. measuring the model agreement with NOE-based distance restraints). A total of 8 different programs (see PROSESS sub-programs below) are used in the PROSESS evaluation and validation process.

PROSESS can handle single-chain X-ray models, multi-chain X-ray models, single-chain NMR ensembles, multi-chain NMR ensembles of monomeric and multimeric proteins. In addition to being able to validate NMR protein structures, PROSESS can be used to validate or evaluate any protein model, regardless of how it was solved (X-ray, NMR, comparative modelling, etc.).

== Output ==
PROSESS generates a detailed and colorful structure validation report, including tables, color-coded images and graphs or bar charts. Many of the tables contain embedded hyperlinks to additional details or explanations. For most of its graphs and charts, PROSESS uses a simple RAG (red, amber, green) color scheme to indicate the quality of different structure parameters for the protein (as a whole), for different members of the structure ensemble, for specific residues and for specific atoms. Different shades of red indicate serious problems, different shades of yellow or amber indicate potential problems and different shades of green indicate that the protein model or its residues/atoms are free of problems. Each color is also assigned a number (ranging from 0 to 9 – with 0 being bad and 9 being excellent) so that the structure quality assessment is more quantifiable. PROSESS's quality indices and quality color scales have been designed specifically to help non-structural biologists to more easily and rapidly understand protein structure validation reports.

== Input ==
1. PDB file (required)
2. Protein sequence in FASTA format (optional)
3. Distance restraints in XPLOR-NIH format (optional)
4. NMR chemical shifts in BMRB NMR-STAR 2.1 format (optional)

== PROSESS model quality categories ==
1. Covalent bond quality;
2. Non-covalent/packing quality;
3. Torsion angle quality;
4. Chemical shift quality (i.e. Model agreement with NMR chemical shifts)
5. NOE quality (i.e. Model agreement with NOE-based distance restraints).

== See also ==
- Nuclear magnetic resonance spectroscopy
- Protein nuclear magnetic resonance spectroscopy
- Protein dynamics#Domains and protein flexibility
- Random Coil Index
- GeNMR
- Protein structure prediction
- Structural bioinformatics
- DSSP (algorithm)
