= Contact number =

In chemistry, a contact number (CN) is a simple solvent exposure measure that measures residue burial in proteins. The definition of CN varies between authors, but is generally defined as the number of either C$\beta$ or C$\alpha$ atoms within a sphere around the C$\beta$ or C$\alpha$ atom of the residue. The radius of the sphere is typically chosen to be between 8 and 14Å.

== See also ==
- Kissing number, a similar concept in mathematics
