= Fourier shell correlation =

In structural biology, as well as in virtually all sciences that produce three-dimensional data, the Fourier shell correlation (FSC) measures the normalised cross-correlation coefficient between two 3-dimensional volumes over corresponding shells in Fourier space (i.e., as a function of spatial frequency). The FSC is the three-dimensional extension of the two-dimensional Fourier ring correlation (FRC); also known as: spatial frequency correlation function.

== Calculation ==
$$FSC(r) =
\frac{\displaystyle\sum_{r_i \in r}{ F_1(r_i) \cdot F_2(r_i)^{\ast} }}
{\displaystyle\sqrt[2]{\sum_{r_i \in r}{ \left|F_1(r_i)\right|^2} \cdot \sum_{r_i \in r}{\left|F_2(r_i)\right|^2}}}$$

where $F_1$ is the complex structure Factor for volume 1, $F_2^{\ast}$ is the complex conjugate of the structure Factor for volume 2, and $r_i$ is the individual voxel element at radius $r$. In this form, the FSC takes two three-dimensional data sets and converts them into a one-dimensional array.

== Applications ==
The FSC originated in cryo-electron microscopy and gradually proliferated to other fields. To measure the FSC, two independently determined 3D volumes are required. In cryo-electron microscopy, the two volumes are the result of two three-dimensional reconstructions, each based on half of the available data set. Typically, random halves are used, although some programs may use the even particle images for one half and the odd particles for the other half of the data set. Some publications quote the FSC 0.5 resolution cutoff, which refers to when the correlation coefficient of the Fourier shells is equal to 0.5. However, determining the resolution threshold remains a controversial issue, with some arguing fixed-value thresholds to be based on incorrect statistical assumptions. Many other criteria using the FSC curve exist, including 3-σ criterion, 5-σ criterion, and the 0.143 cutoff. The half-bit criterion indicates at which resolution we have collected enough information to reliably interpret the 3-dimensional volume, and the (modified) 3-sigma criterion indicates where the FSC systematically emerges above the expected random correlations of the background noise. The FSC 0.143 cutoff was proposed in part to make the resolution measurement comparable to measurements used in X-ray crystallography. Currently, the 0.143 cutoff is the most commonly used criterion for the resolution of cryo-EM reconstructions better than 10 ångström resolution.

== See also ==
- Resolution (electron density)
