= Accessible surface area =

Surface area of a biomolecule accessible to a solvent

Illustration of the solvent accessible surface in comparison to the van der Waals surface. The van der Waals surface as given by the atomic radii is shown in red. The accessible surface is drawn with dashed lines and is created by tracing the center of the probe sphere (in blue) as it rolls along the van der Waals surface. Note that the probe radius depicted here is of smaller scale than the typical 1.4Å.

The accessible surface area (ASA) or solvent-accessible surface area (SASA) is the surface area of a biomolecule that is accessible to a solvent. Measurement of ASA is usually described in units of square angstroms (a standard unit of measurement in molecular biology). ASA was first described by Lee & Richards in 1971 and is sometimes called the Lee-Richards molecular surface. ASA is typically calculated using the 'rolling ball' algorithm developed by Shrake & Rupley in 1973. This algorithm uses a sphere (of solvent) of a particular radius to 'probe' the surface of the molecule.

== Methods of calculating ASA ==
=== Shrake–Rupley algorithm ===
The Shrake–Rupley algorithm is a numerical method that draws a mesh of points equidistant from each atom of the molecule and uses the number of these points that are solvent accessible to determine the surface area. The points are drawn at a water molecule's estimated radius beyond the van der Waals radius, which is effectively similar to 'rolling a ball' along the surface. All points are checked against the surface of neighboring atoms to determine whether they are buried or accessible. The number of points accessible is multiplied by the portion of surface area each point represents to calculate the ASA. The choice of the 'probe radius' does have an effect on the observed surface area, as using a smaller probe radius detects more surface details and therefore reports a larger surface. A typical value is 1.4Å, which approximates the radius of a water molecule. Another factor that affects the results is the definition of the VDW radii of the atoms in the molecule under study. For example, the molecule may often lack hydrogen atoms, which are implicit in the structure. The hydrogen atoms may be implicitly included in the atomic radii of the 'heavy' atoms, with a measure called the 'group radii'. In addition, the number of points created on the van der Waals surface of each atom determines another aspect of discretization, where more points provide an increased level of detail.

=== LCPO method ===
The LCPO method uses a linear approximation of the two-body problem for a quicker analytical calculation of ASA. The approximations used in LCPO result in an error in the range of 1-3 Å².

=== Power Diagram method ===
In 2011, a method was presented that calculates ASA fast and analytically using a power diagram.

== Applications ==
Accessible surface area is often used when calculating the transfer free energy required to move a biomolecule from an aqueous solvent to a non-polar solvent, such as a lipid environment. The LCPO method is also used when calculating implicit solvent effects in the molecular dynamics software package AMBER.

It is recently suggested that (predicted) accessible surface area can be used to improve prediction of protein secondary structure.

== Relation to solvent-excluded surface ==
The ASA is closely related to the concept of the solvent-excluded surface (also known as the Connolly's molecular surface area or simply Connolly surface), which is imagined as a cavity in bulk solvent. It is also calculated in practice via a rolling-ball algorithm developed by Frederic Richards and implemented three-dimensionally by Michael Connolly in 1983 and Tim Richmond in 1984. Connolly spent several more years perfecting the method.

== See also ==
- Implicit solvation
- Van der Waals surface
- VADAR tool for analyzing peptide and protein structures
- Relative accessible surface area
