= Resolution (structural biology) =

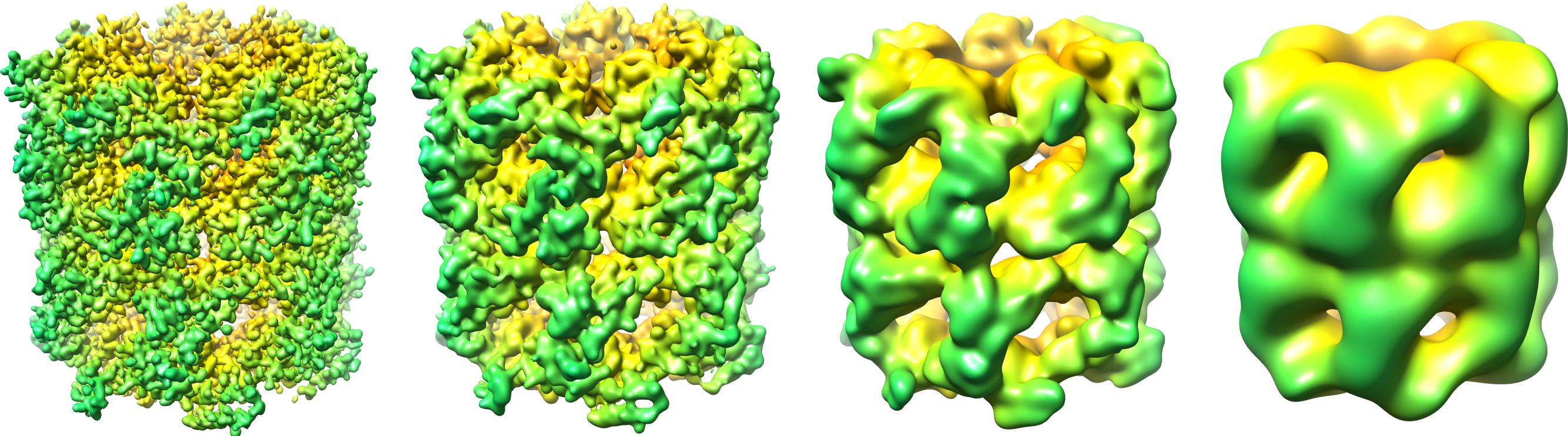
Series of density maps for GroEL: from left to right, 4 Å, 8 Å, 16 Å, and 32 Å resolution. The details are smeared away as the resolution becomes lower.

Resolution in the context of structural biology is the ability to distinguish the presence or absence of atoms or groups of atoms in a biomolecular structure. Usually, the structure originates from methods such as X-ray crystallography, electron crystallography, or cryo-electron microscopy. The resolution is measured of the "map" of the structure produced from experiment, where an atomic model would then be fit into. Due to their different natures and interactions with matter, in X-ray methods the map produced is of the electron density of the system (usually a crystal), whereas in electron methods the map is of the electrostatic potential of the system. In both cases, atomic positions are assumed similarly.

== Qualitative measures ==
In structural biology, resolution can be broken down into 4 groups: (1) sub-atomic, when information about the electron density is obtained and quantum effects can be studied, (2) atomic, individual atoms are visible and an accurate three-dimensional model can be constructed, (3) helical, secondary structure, such as alpha helices and beta sheets; RNA helices (in ribosomes), (4) domain, no secondary structure is resolvable.

Qualitative Interpretations of Protein Structures at Various Resolution Ranges
Resolution (Å)	Meaning
>4.0	Individual atomic coordinates meaningless. Secondary structure elements can be determined.
3.0 - 4.0	Fold possibly correct, but errors are very likely. Many sidechains placed with wrong rotamer.
2.5 - 3.0	Fold likely correct except that some surface loops might be mismodelled. Several long, thin sidechains (lys, glu, gln, etc.) and small sidechains (ser, val, thr, etc.) likely to have wrong rotamers.
2.0 - 2.5	As 2.5 - 3.0, but number of sidechains in wrong rotamer is considerably less. Many small errors can normally be detected. Fold normally correct and number of errors in surface loops is small. Water molecules and small ligands become visible.
1.5 - 2.0	Few residues have wrong rotamer. Many small errors can normally be detected. Folds are rarely incorrect, even in surface loops.
0.5 - 1.5	In general, structures have almost no errors at this resolution. Individual atoms in a structure can be resolved. Rotamer libraries and geometry studies are made from these structures.

== X-ray crystallography ==
As the crystal's repeating unit, its unit cell, becomes larger and more complex, the atomic-level picture provided by X-ray crystallography becomes less well-resolved (more "fuzzy") for a given number of observed reflections. Two limiting cases of X-ray crystallography are often discerned, "small-molecule" and "macromolecular" crystallography. Small-molecule crystallography typically involves crystals with fewer than 100 atoms in their asymmetric unit; such crystal structures are usually so well resolved that its atoms can be discerned as isolated "blobs" of electron density. By contrast, macromolecular crystallography often involves tens of thousands of atoms in the unit cell. Such crystal structures are generally less well-resolved (more "smeared out"); the atoms and chemical bonds appear as tubes of electron density, rather than as isolated atoms. In general, small molecules are also easier to crystallize than macromolecules; however, X-ray crystallography has proven possible even for viruses with hundreds of thousands of atoms.

== Cryo-electron microscopy ==
In cryo-electron microscopy (cryoEM), resolution is typically measured by the Fourier shell correlation (FSC), a three-dimensional extension of the Fourier ring correlation (FRC), which is also known as the spatial frequency correlation function. The FSC is a comparison of the Fourier transforms of two different constructed electrostatic potential maps, each map constructed from a random half of the original dataset.

Historically, there was much disagreement on which cutoff in the FSC would provide a good estimation of resolution, but the emerging gold-standard is the FSC cutoff of 0.143. This cutoff is derived from equivalencies to the X-ray crystallography standards of resolution definition.

=== Historical measurements ===
Many other criteria for determining resolution using the FSC curve exist, including the 3-σ criterion, 5-σ criterion, and 0.5 threshold. However, fixed-value thresholds (like 0.5, or 0.143) were argued to be based on incorrect statistical assumptions, though 0.143 has been shown to be strict enough so as to likely not overestimate resolution. The half-bit criterion indicates at which resolution there exists enough information to reliably interpret the volume, and the (modified) 3-σ criterion indicates where the FSC systematically emerges above the expected random correlations of the background noise.

In 2007, a resolution criterion independent of the FSC, Fourier Neighbor Correlation (FNC), was developed using the correlation between neighboring Fourier voxels to distinguish signal from noise. The FNC can be used to predict a less-biased FSC.

== See also ==
- Structural biology
- X-ray crystallography
- Cryogenic electron microscopy
- Image resolution
