= Hepatitis B in China =

Hepatitis B is endemic in China. Of the 350 million individuals worldwide infected with the hepatitis B virus (HBV), one-third reside in China. As of 2006 China has immunized 11.1 million children in its poorest provinces as part of several programs initiated by the Chinese government and as part of the Global Alliance for Vaccines and Immunization (GAVI). However, the effects of these programs have yet to reach levels of immunization that would limit the spread of hepatitis B effectively.

== Epidemiology ==
=== Prevalence ===
Of the 350 million to 400 million individuals worldwide infected with the hepatitis B virus (HBV), one-third reside in China, with 130 million carriers and 30 million chronically infected. Since the Expanded Program on Immunization (EPI) beginning 1992, the prevalence of HBV has declined, especially among children 3 to 12 years old. During a 5-year period, 10.0% of patients with chronic hepatitis developed cirrhosis, and 20.3% of the cases with compensated cirrhosis progressed to decompensated cirrhosis. 6.5% of the people with cirrhosis and chronic hepatitis progressed to hepatocellular carcinoma (HCC). 5-year survival for compensated cirrhosis is 55%, that for decompensated cirrhosis is 14%, and that for HCC is less than 5%. Every year, 300,000 people die from HBV-related diseases in China, including 180,000 patients with HCC. However, the incidence of hepatitis B is still increasing, from 21.9 in 100,000 people in 1990 to 53.3 in 100,000 in 2003. That increase has occurred despite a vaccination program for newborn babies since the 1990s, which showed good effectiveness for reducing chronic HBV infection in children.

=== Transmission ===
The reason for this increased HBV infection is unknown, because hepatitis B has no clear transmission routes in many people in China, although both neonatal infection and horizontal transmission during early childhood are still the most common routes. During and before the Cultural revolution many of the cases came from re-used needles that were contaminated with HBV.

== Programs ==
=== Public awareness ===
Public awareness of the disease, which is spread through the exchange of bodily fluids, is not as high as it is for HIV and AIDS. In some rural areas, doctors have reused syringes and unknowingly spread the disease, particularly among children.

=== Vaccination ===
By 2006, China has successfully immunised 11.1 million children living in the country's poorest provinces against hepatitis B according to the Chinese health ministry, and the Global Alliance for Vaccines and Immunization (GAVI). However, China still has a long way to go before immunisation levels reach a percentage able to limit the spread of hepatitis B. China's health minister, Gao Qiang told a Beijing press conference that the project, while effective, has covered only one third of all children born in China since the project began in 2002. This does not mean the rest of China's children went unvaccinated. However, even within the project's target area, over one million newborns went unvaccinated each year because of access issues; health-care costs, lack of birth attendants, and the remoteness of their birthplaces, such as herder's huts, mountain villages, and remote farms.

Until 2005, when a law banning the practice was passed, parents were charged fees for the administration of the vaccine. Even though the GAVI alliance (whose partners include UNICEF and the WHO), and Chinese government were providing the vaccine and one-use needles free of charge, health-care workers charged fees that parents were unwilling or unable to pay.

Based on a 1992 epidemiological survey, the disease burden of those who are chronically infected with hepatitis B in China is estimated to be at 120 million, one third of the overall burden (360 million) as estimated by the WHO.

China's national target is to reach greater than 85% vaccination. The joint project with the GAVI alliance has shown that this is feasible with three quarters of the 1301 project counties reporting that 85% or more children received three doses of HepB vaccine. In hospitals designated as project hospitals, the percentage of newborns vaccinated within 24 hours of birth is now over 90%. However, the overall newborn vaccination rate in the region covered by the GAVI alliance/government joint project was 70%, lower than the 75% they hoped to achieve.

Achieving long-term success will require "assuring no new financial barriers arise", said Julian Lob-Levyt, Executive Secretary of the GAVI Alliance. "This is one of the greatest challenges and the solution lies not just within China but with a global community mobilized to ensure access to vaccine financing for all developing nations."

Home to a large population of ethnic minorities of low socioeconomic status, the Qinghai province is a remote, often neglected, rural region of China with a high prevalence of chronic hepatitis B. Since many children 5 years of age and older in Qinghai were not vaccinated against the hepatitis B virus at birth, a private-public partnership was formed between the Ping and Amy Chao Foundation, the ZeShan Foundation, the Asian Liver Center at Stanford University, the China Center for Disease Control and Prevention, the Chinese Foundation for Hepatitis Prevention and Control, and the Qinghai government. Using the existing provincial China CDC structure, this private-public partnership in Qinghai resulted in a unique two-part school-based immunization program to educate and provide free Hep B vaccination for all children in kindergarten and grade school within the region.

Between 2006 and 2008, this program demonstrated the feasibility and successful implementation of:

1. A province-wide catch-up vaccination program that reached 600,000 children in 2,200 schools, and
2. A hepatitis B education program incorporated into the school curriculum.

Impact: The success of this large scale province-wide demonstration program led the Chinese government to announce the adoption of a new policy beginning in 2009 to provide free catch-up hepatitis B vaccination for all children in China under the age of 15 who have not been vaccinated.

=== Treatment ===
Because a high load of HBV in patients is the main cause of hepatitis progression, the ultimate goal in treatment is to eradicate the virus before irreversible liver damage occurs.

Unfortunately, there are no agents available with high enough efficacy and safety to fully eradicate HBV. Neither interferon alpha, including standard and pegylated forms, nor nucleotide analogues (including lamivudine, adefovir dipivoxil, and most recently, entecavir) could eradicate HBV covalently-closed-circular DNA in liver cells, which is the replication model for HBV recurrence. However, no agents are available to break through the host's immune tolerance to HBV, which is another important reason for persistent infection with HBV, although some patients respond well temporarily to administration of interferon and nucleotide analogues alone or in combination regimens. Some traditional Chinese herbs, such as kushenin (Sophora flavescens) and some complex prescriptions, have some efficacy as antivirals and in the protection of liver function, although the specific mechanism and components need to be identified. The current treatment in China is the combination of antiviral agents (lamivudine, adefovir dipivoxil), immune modulators (interferon alpha, peginterferon alpha, thymosin), and hepatic protectors (such as glycyrrhizin, glucuronolactone). The Chinese spend around ¥900 billion (US$110 billion) on these regimens every year. Apart from cost, patients and carriers of HBV infection are often confronted with tough conditions and social pressures, although such discrimination is illegal in China.

Chinese drug regulation authorities have approved Swiss pharmaceutical firm Novartis AG's drug Sebivo, a brand name for telbivudine, as a treatment for chronic hepatitis B in February 2007. The decision comes shortly after Sebivo was recommended for approval in the European Union. The medicine was developed jointly by Novartis and U.S. biotech firm Idenix Pharmaceuticals Inc and has been shown in trials to produce significantly greater viral suppression compared to the commonly used treatment lamivudine. Sebivo won its first major approval in Switzerland in September 2006.

== Governmental intervention ==
=== Problems ===
There have been relatively few campaigns aimed at ending the practice of reusing needles. For standard preventative practice, a vaccination within the first 24 hours after birth is considered the best way to prevent the disease from spreading from mother to child. But it was not until 1992 that China included it as part of a routine immunization program. Even then, the price was relatively high compared with other postnatal vaccinations, and families had to pay for it privately. Many have suffered and their families, especially in the poor countryside, decided to go without.

According to China's Ministry of Health website, in 2005 the PRC government belatedly passed a regulation making the vaccination free. The PRC government has set a goal of reducing the overall hepatitis B infection rate to less than 7% over the next five years, and the rate of infection for children younger than 5 to less than 1%. It has been said by medical observers of prevention programs in the country that the program can be a viable model for other developing countries trying to stop the spread of diseases (including hepatitis B) that can be prevented by vaccines. But a study of some campaigns shows that more than 1 million Chinese babies born each year in the area covered by the government initiated programs are not receiving the vaccination. Officials involved in the hepatitis B vaccination programs say that in many of China's poverty-stricken rural areas, children are delivered at home in remote mountain villages or nomadic herders' tents, far from hospitals and access to medical information. The Chinese Center for Disease Control and Prevention (China CDC) have conducted research that supports the evidence that "there was and is still a huge bottleneck to ensure the delivery of the timely birth dosage to home births".

Another problem is the growing size of China's migrant labor force or "floating population." Farmers or peasants who become urban laborers move frequently around the country and often do not seek medical attention. The immunization rate among them remains low, said China CDC. One major problem facing Chinese people infected with hepatitis B is that illegal blood testing is required by most employers in China. Anyone that tests positive for hepatitis B is either denied employment or fired. Laws do exist to protect the privacy of employees and job seekers but they are not enforced.

=== Research ===
Hepatitis B and its related disorders are important public health issues in China, which not only presents challenges for doctors and scientists but also increases the burden for the government. Last year, the Chinese Government funded research with around Ɲ3 billion (US$390 million), mainly against hepatitis B and related diseases over the next decade.

Research will include: large retrospective and prospective studies of the population vaccinated against hepatitis B and the incidence of HCC; genetic variation in HBV and its subtypes, and mutations in HBV DNA in the response to interferon and nucleotide analogues; host-gene variation and the therapeutic response, including single-nuclear polymorphisms and gene copy-number variations; virus mutation and the mechanism of the immune response in fulminant liver failure, and the immunological factors which cause liver injury and the markers which predict reduction in liver function; assessment and prediction of liver fibrosis by non-invasive biomarkers, and interference with fibrosis from small chemical compounds or traditional Chinese medicines; prediction of the development, metastasis, and prognosis of HCC by molecular typing; and the identification of important signal transduction pathways in HCC and the development of new small chemical compounds to target HCC.

=== Progress ===
To measure the results, the Government also set goals that corresponded to these research projects. The goals include: completion of the immunoprophylaxis strategy, such as HBV vaccine, to decrease the incidence of HCC by more than 10%; identification of molecular biomarkers, and the creation of molecular-typing diagnostic kits for the prediction of the therapeutic response; the development of regimens to treat HBV; the identification of biomarkers to predict the aggressiveness of severe hepatitis B and the development of a kit for early diagnosis of liver cirrhosis; the identification of markers (biological and genomic, and small molecules) for early diagnosis and to predict recurrence and metastasis, and the development of new drugs for HCC, to increase the rate of early diagnosis by more than 20% and 5-year survival by more than 5%. The fight against HBV and its related disorders is now thought of as a long-term one by the health authorities.

== Social impact ==
=== Discrimination ===
People with Hepatitis B in China frequently face discrimination in all aspects of life and work. For example, many Chinese employers and universities refuse to accept anyone who tests positive. Some kindergartens refuse admission to children who are carriers of the virus. The hepatitis problem is a reflection of the vast developmental gap between China's rural and urban areas. The largest problem facing Chinese people infected with HBV is that illegal blood testing is required by most employers in China. According to a report by PBS, faking blood tests by hiring uninfected individuals to take them has become widespread. Following an incident involving a Hepatitis B carrier's killing of an employer and other calls against discriminatory employment practices, China's ministries of health and personnel announced that Hepatitis B carriers must not be discriminated against when seeking employment and education. While the laws exist to protect the privacy of employees and job seekers, many believe that they are not enforced.

=== "In the Hepatitis B Camp" ===
"In the Hepatitis B Camp" is a popular website for hepatitis B carriers' human rights in China. Its online forum is the world's biggest such forum with over 300,000 members. The website was first shut down by the Chinese government in November 2007. Lu Jun, the head of the rights group, managed to reopen the website by moving it to an overseas server, but the authorities in May 2008 began blocking access to the website within China, only 10 days after government officials participated in an event for World Hepatitis Day at the Great Wall of China. An official had told the head of the rights group, Lu Jun, at the time that the closure was due to the Beijing Olympic Games.

== See also ==
- Jade Ribbon Campaign
- HIV/AIDS in the People's Republic of China
- Hepatitis
- Public health in the People's Republic of China
- Tuberculosis in China
