= Mudana =

- village
- Location in Gujarat, India Mudana (India)
- Coordinates: 23.94°N 72.42°E
- Country: India
- State: Gujarat
- District: Patan

Languages
  - Official: Gujarati, Hindi
- Time zone: UTC+5:30 (IST)
- Vehicle registration: GJ
- Website: gujaratindia.com

Mudana is a village in Patan district, Gujarat, India.

In March 2009, it was affected by the 2009 Gujarat hepatitis outbreak. At least one patient receiving treatment for the virus absconded from the hospital and was seen as a potential risk to public health.

This was the oldest village out of the 25 Ismaili Villages. There is also the tomb of Pir Kasam Shah and their family members.

== Geography ==
Mudana is located at 23.94°N 72.42°E.
