= Jade Ribbon Campaign =

Asian Liver Center campaign

- Formation: 2001; 25 years ago
- Headquarters: Palo Alto
- Parent organization: Stanford Asian Liver Center
- Website: https://joinjade.org/

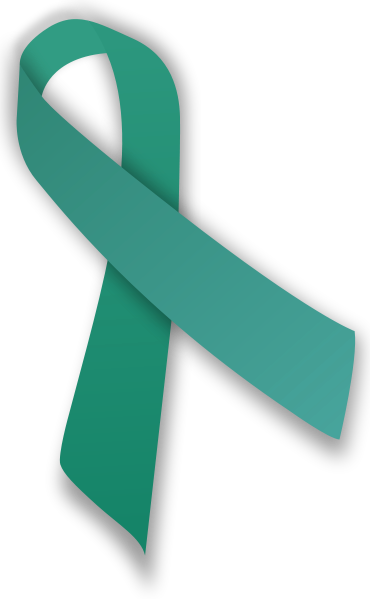
Jade Ribbon

The Jade Ribbon Campaign (JRC) also known as JoinJade, was launched by the Asian Liver Center (ALC) at Stanford University in May 2001 during Asian Pacific American Heritage Month to help spread awareness internationally about hepatitis B (HBV) and liver cancer in Asian and Pacific Islander (API) communities.

The objective of the Jade Ribbon Campaign is twofold: (1) to eradicate HBV worldwide; and (2) to reduce the incidence and mortality associated with liver cancer.

Considered to be the essence of heaven and earth, Jade is believed in many Asian cultures to bring good luck and longevity while deflecting negativity. Folded like the Chinese character "人" (ren) meaning "person" or "people", the Jade Ribbon symbolizes the spirit of the campaign in bringing the Asian and global community together to combat this silent epidemic.

== Outreach efforts ==
Since the campaign's founding, the Asian Liver Center (ALC) has been spearheading the Jade Ribbon Campaign through public service announcements in various media such as newspapers, magazines, TV, radio, billboard, and buses targeting communities with large API populations. The ALC also holds numerous seminars for health professionals and the public, cultural fairs, conferences, and HBV screening/vaccination events.

=== 3 For Life ===
One of the ALC's largest achievements was the founding of 3 for Life in September 2004, a pilot program in collaboration with the San Francisco Department of Public Health that provided low-cost hepatitis A and B vaccinations and free hepatitis B testing to the San Francisco community every first and third Saturday of the month for a year. The program tested and vaccinated over 1,200 people—50% of which were found to be unprotected against HBV and 10% to be positive for HBV. Upon the completion of 3 for Life in September 2005, the ALC currently is working on plans to launch a similar screening/vaccination program to service the large API population in Los Angeles.

=== LIVERight ===
The Answer to Cancer (A2C) run was founded by Adrian Elkins, a 20-year-old student at Southern Oregon University who was diagnosed with liver cancer in 2002. Had he known during his childhood that his ethnicity and chronic hepatitis B infection increased his chance of developing liver cancer by 100%, he would have been regularly monitored for liver damage. He had no idea that hepatitis B – a disease he contracted at birth in Calcutta, India – causes 80% of the world's liver cancer cases. Adrian battled his disease for ten months, working tirelessly to organize an event to raise money for liver cancer research. Adrian saw the first-ever A2C run take place on August 8, 2003. Thanks to the generous support of friends, families and numerous companies, the 2003 Answer to Cancer Race was able to raise more than $20,000 for three charities and reach out to more than 240 participants. Adrian died only eight days after this first race.

Adrian Elkins inspired the Asian Liver Center to start LIVERight on the go!, a 5K Run/Walk to raise awareness about hepatitis B and liver cancer in the Asian Pacific Islander community.

On April 30, 2005, in San Francisco's Golden Gate Park, the Asian Liver Center and the Answer to Cancer Foundation hosted LIVERight, the first 5K run/walk to raise awareness about hepatitis B and liver cancer.

On November 11, 2006, the 2nd annual LIVERight was held at Stanford's Sand Hill Fields. The community event had 700 registered participants, 100 volunteers, and raised over $135,000.

The 3rd Annual LIVERight 5k Run/Walk took place on May 10, 2008. It had over 600 registered runners and raised over $100,000 to fight hepatitis B and liver cancer.

The 4th Annual LIVERight 5k Run/Walk was held on Saturday, May 2, 2009, at Golden Gate Park in San Francisco, California. The over 400 runners raised over $100,000 to fight liver cancer and hepatitis B.

The goal of LIVERight was not only to raise money to support ALC's outreach efforts, but more importantly to educate and increase awareness of this pressing public health issue. Educational displays, informational booths and course signs were unique and significant components to the event. The education allowed participants to learn more about hepatitis B prevention and treatment, as well as hear the real stories about the lives lost and won to liver cancer.

=== Jade Ribbon Campaign reusable bag ===
99 Ranch Market and the Asian Liver Center at Stanford University joined to create the Jade Ribbon reusable shopping bag—an environmentally-friendly way to raise awareness about an urgent health concern for Asians. The eco-friendly reusable shopping bag, along with educational materials on hepatitis B, was made available from July 24 to August 31, 2009, with every donation of two dollars or more to the Jade Ribbon Campaign to support hepatitis B education and outreach.

=== Team HBV collegiate chapters ===
Team HBV is the official chapter of the Asian Liver Center at Stanford University and is currently the only student-run, non-profit, collegiate organization in the United States that addresses the high incidence of hepatitis B and liver cancer in the Asian and Pacific Islander community.

The mission of Team HBV is to advance the goals of the ALC at college campuses across the United States to help fight hepatitis B and liver cancer worldwide.

Adopted by the Asian Liver Center in Fall 2006, the first official Team HBV chapters were founded in Cornell, Duke, and University of California, Berkeley. There are now Team HBV Collegiate Chapters at Duke, Cornell, UC Berkeley, Stanford, Brown, UC Davis, Harvard, Wesleyan, the University of Pennsylvania, Rice, Wesleyan, and UC San Diego, and international chapters at Jiaotong University in China, Central University for Nationalities, Tsinghua University, and Minzu University of China.

The Inaugural Team HBV Collegiate Conference, organized by the Asian Liver Center, brings together individuals representing Team HBV chapters worldwide, Jade Ribbon Campaign advocates, and hepatitis B and liver cancer experts. The conference provides a professional forum for Team HBV chapters to share insights, best practices, and strategies to advance hepatitis B outreach, education, and communication. The first Team HBV Collegiate Conference took place November 2009 at Stanford University.

=== San Francisco Hep B Free ===
San Francisco Hep B Free is a citywide campaign to turn San Francisco into the first hepatitis B free city in the nation. This unprecedented 2-year-long campaign beginning April 2007 will screen, vaccinate and treat all San Francisco Asian and Pacific Islander (API) residents of hepatitis B (HBV) by providing convenient, free or low-cost testing opportunities at partnering health facilities and events.

The SF Hep B Free campaign puts San Francisco at the forefront of America in fighting chronic hepatitis. It will be the largest, most intensive healthcare campaign for Asian and Pacific Islanders in the US This initiative has received national attention and is being looked to as a model by the California legislature. Mayor Gavin Newsom, Assemblywoman Fiona Ma and Supervisor Ed Jew are leading the effort with more than 50 healthcare and Asian Pacific Islander organizations. The SF Board of Supervisors and SF Health Commission have passed unanimous resolutions supporting SF Hep B Free.

=== Cal Hep B Free ===
Cal Hep B Free is a student-led, not-for-profit health promotion pilot program launched on September 15, 2008, at the University of California, Berkeley. Supported by numerous student organizations on campus and endorsed by Vice Chancellor of Student Affairs Harry Le Grande, City of Berkeley Public Health Division, and California Assemblywoman Fiona Ma, the major student-initiated campaign effort brings together university students, faculty, and administration at UC Berkeley in an effort to screen, vaccinate, and treat high-risk ethnic groups, particularly individuals of Asian and Pacific Islander (API), Middle Eastern, Eastern European, Russian, and African descent for hepatitis B (HBV). The Cal Hep B Free campaign will allow UC Berkeley to join San Francisco Hep B Free, the largest healthcare campaign in the US to target APIs in the US, at the forefront of America in fighting chronic hepatitis B.

The slogan for Cal Hep B Free is: B SMART, B TESTED, B FREE! and outlines the specific objectives of the campaign:

1. B SMART: Dispel misconceptions and create campus awareness about the health risks of HBV and the importance of screening for HBV.
2. B TESTED: Promote routine hepatitis B screenings and assist and direct students, faculty, and staff to campus and other local sites where they may obtain free or low-cost screenings.
3. B FREE: Design and implement a unique, coalition-partnership model that involves campus and local entities to maximize awareness and sustainability. Knowledge is power and can prevent what you don't know from killing you!

=== Erik's DeliCafe Partnership ===
JoinJade campaign at Stanford University partnered with three Erik's DeliCafe locations to promote hepatitis B and liver health awareness in Santa Clara County, where an estimated 31,273 people are living with chronic hepatitis B. The collaboration aimed to promote testing, as diagnosis and regular monitoring significantly reduce a chronic carrier's chance of developing liver cancer.

Franchise owners Mayank and Ambika Agrawal distributed awareness inserts to 5,000 customers between July 15 – July 28, 2019, in recognition of World Hepatitis Day. The owners also helped sponsor scholarships for students to attend the Annual Youth Leadership Conference on Asian and Pacific Islander Health.

== International efforts ==
=== Qinghai Project ===
Home to a large population of ethnic minorities of low socioeconomic status, the Qinghai province is a remote, often neglected, rural region of China with a high prevalence of chronic hepatitis B. Since many children 5 years of age and older in Qinghai were not vaccinated against the hepatitis B virus at birth, a private-public partnership was formed between the Ping and Amy Chao Foundation, the ZeShan Foundation, the Asian Liver Center at Stanford University, the China Center for Disease Control and Prevention, the Chinese Foundation for Hepatitis Prevention and Control, and the Qinghai government. Using the existing provincial China CDC structure, this private-public partnership in Qinghai resulted in a unique two-part school-based immunization program to educate and provide free Hep B vaccination for all children in kindergarten and grade school within the region.

Between 2006 and 2008, this program demonstrated the feasibility and successful implementation of:

1. A province-wide catch-up vaccination program that reached 600,000 children in 2,200 schools, and
2. A hepatitis B education program incorporated into the school curriculum.

Impact: The success of this large scale province-wide demonstration program led the Chinese government to announce the adoption of a new policy beginning in 2009 to provide free catch-up hepatitis B vaccination for all children in China under the age of 15 who have not been vaccinated.

== Prevalence and risks for Asians and Pacific Islanders ==
While 0.3% of the United States population has chronic hepatitis B infection, APIs make up more than half of the 1.3–1.5 million known hepatitis B carriers. Depending on the country of origin, 5–15% of foreign born APIs in the US are hepatitis B carriers. In some Pacific Rim countries, as many as 10–20% of the population are hepatitis B carriers.

Despite the availability of the hepatitis B vaccine, vaccination rates outside the US are low and hepatitis B remains a global health problem. Therefore, many children worldwide remain unvaccinated and many adults may be chronic carriers. The World Health Organization (WHO) estimates that there are 350–400 million people with chronic hepatitis B and many are not even aware of their condition. Although most hepatitis B carriers have no symptoms, they can still transmit the infection and develop liver cancer.

== Reasons for lack of diagnosis ==
The danger of hepatitis B lies in its silent transmission and progression. Many chronic hepatitis B carriers are asymptomatic (have no symptoms) and feel perfectly healthy. Chronically infected individuals may exhibit normal blood tests for liver function and be granted a clean bill of health. The diagnosis cannot be made without a specific blood test for the presence of the hepatitis B surface antigen (HBsAg), a marker for chronic infection. Since the detection of hepatitis B is so easily missed, even by doctors, it is also up to the patient to specifically request the HBsAg test. Early detection not only benefits the person tested, but prevents infection from being passed silently from one child to another, and from one generation to another.

In addition, misconceptions about the endemic nature of hepatitis B in the API population and the efficacy of US vaccination programs has led many individuals and health-care providers to overlook the need for testing for APIs.

== Transmission ==
Most APIs are infected by HBV at birth by their carrier mothers (perinatal infection). Individuals who are infected at birth can develop liver cancer at age 35 or earlier. Also, individuals infected at birth will carry the virus for life, regardless of future vaccination. Transmission is also common during early childhood through direct contact with blood of infected individuals, occurring from contact between open wounds, sharing contaminated toothbrushes or razors, or through contaminated medical/dental tools. Hepatitis B can also be transmitted by blood transfusions, sharing or reusing needles for injection or tattoos, and unprotected sex.

== Common misconceptions ==
Contrary to common misconceptions

- Hepatitis B is not transmitted through food/water.
- Hepatitis B is not transmitted through casual contact, such as hugging or shaking hands.
- Hepatitis B is not transmitted through kissing, sneezing, or coughing.
- Hepatitis B is not transmitted through breastfeeding.
- Vaccination does not help individuals who are already infected with hepatitis B.

== Mortality risks ==
Without appropriate management and screening, one in four hepatitis B infected individuals (25%) will die from liver cancer or cirrhosis (liver damage leading to scarring and eventually death from liver failure). Some develop cancer as early as 30 years of age. Every year, approximately one million people worldwide die from the disease because they are not diagnosed before the point where current treatment can be effective. Because so many chronically infected individuals feel perfectly healthy even with early liver cancer, the disease can progress without the carrier even knowing. When symptoms do appear, it is often only at the late stages of the disease. All people with chronic hepatitis B infection, whether they feel healthy or sick, are at risk for developing liver cancer or cirrhosis. Finding the cancer when it is small by regular screening remains the best chance of surviving liver cancer.

Hepatitis B is one of the largest health threats for Asians and Pacific Islanders. All individuals of Asian descent should request the hepatitis B surface antigen test (HBsAg) to identify infection. Also, individuals should request the hepatitis B surface antibody test (HBsAb) to identify immunity. 5%–10% of those vaccinated do not develop the antibodies and are not protected. The only way to prevent deaths from liver cancer is to identify chronic HBV individuals early enough for treatment.

== Statistics ==
=== Global statistics ===
- 350–400 million people worldwide have chronic HBV infection (compare with 40 million living with HIV)
- Without appropriate treatment or monitoring, 1 in 4 people with chronic HBV will die of liver cancer, cirrhosis or liver failure.
- HBV takes a million lives a year in the world.
- HBV is second only to tobacco in causing the most cancer deaths worldwide.
- 80% of primary liver cancer (hepatocellular carcinoma) is caused by chronic HBV infection.
- HBV is preventable with a vaccine available for over 25 years.

=== United States statistics ===
- HBV is the biggest health disparity between Asian American and White Americans.
- 10% of Asian Americans are chronically infected versus less than 0.3% of the general population.
- 1.4 million people are chronically infected in US and more than half are Asian.
- Liver cancer incidence is 6 – 13 times higher for Asians.
- Liver cancer mortality remains higher than other cancers despite advances in research and medical technology:

Trends in 5-Year Survival by Year of Diagnosis in the US
Site	1974–76	1983–85	1992–99
Breast cancer	75%	78%	87%
Colon cancer	51%	58%	62%
Prostate cancer	67%	75%	98%
Liver cancer	4%	6%	7%

- There are more HBsAg-positive (chronically infected with HBV) API women than women of other ethnicities:

Incidence of chronic HBV in the US by ethnicity
Maternal race/ethnicity	2002 births	Estimated maternal HBsAg prevalence	Estimated births to HBsAg(+) women
Non-Hispanic	2,298,156	0.13	2,988
African American	593,691	0.5	2,968
Asian Pacific Islander (foreign born)	175,264	8.9	15,598
Asian Pacific Islander (US born)	35,643	1.4	499
Hispanic	35,643	1.4	499
Other	42,330	0.5	212
Total	4,021,726		23,054

- API population has increased 4x since 1980 (14.4 million in 2002)
- Foreign born API: 2.5 million in 1980 and 8.3 million in 2002
  - 75% came from countries with chronic HBV rates of 8–15%
- APIs tend to live in large households; 20% live with 5 or more people
- Many API seek medical treatments from Traditional Chinese Medicine (TCM) practitioners.
  - No routine blood tests and medical check-ups.
  - Under-reporting of both acute and chronic HBV infection.
- Federal ACIP guidelines recommending that universal infant vaccination against HBV at birth, regardless of the mother's HBV status were implemented in November 1991.

=== China statistics ===
- 1/3 of the world's chronic HBV patients live in China.
- 130 million Chinese (1 in 10) have chronic HBV.
- In one day, 3 times more people die of HBV than the entire SARS outbreak.
- In two years, fewer than 10 people have died from avian flu in China.
- HBV kills 500,000 mainland Chinese each year (50% of global deaths).
- Comparing HBV with HIV/AIDS in mainland China:

HBV	HIV/AIDS
130 million with chronic HBV	650,000 with HIV
10% of population	< 0.05% of population
500,000 die of liver cancer and/or liver failure each year	44,000 died of AIDS in 2003

=== Rates of hepatitis B infection ===
- Chronic HBV infection rates in US and Western Europe (lowest): 0.1-0.5%
- Chronic HBV infection rates in Asia, Pacific and sub-Saharan Africa: 10% (5–20%)
- Chronic HBV infection rates in API Americans: 7% (approximately 840,000)
  - Foreign born API: 9% (range 5–15%)
  - US born API: 1.4%
- Chronic HBV infection rates in Caucasian, Hispanic, or African American: 0.1%, 0.1%, 0.5%

== See also ==
- Hepatitis B
- Liver cancer
- Hepatocellular carcinoma (HCC)
- San Francisco Hep B Free
- Hepatitis B in China
