= San Francisco Hep B Free =

American citywide campaign in California

San Francisco Hep B Free is a citywide campaign to turn San Francisco into the first hepatitis B free city in the United States. This unprecedented campaign began in 2007, with the objective to screen, vaccinate, and treat all San Francisco Asian and Pacific Islander (API) residents for hepatitis B by providing convenient, free or low-cost testing opportunities at partnering health facilities and events.

API's have the highest risk of hepatitis B of any ethnic group. San Francisco's API residents comprise 34% of the city's population and bear a disproportionate burden of liver cancer and undetected hepatitis B infection. Hepatitis B is a serious disease responsible for 80% of all liver cancers among APIs. San Francisco has the highest liver cancer rate in the nation. It is estimated that one in ten people in the API community have an undiagnosed infection. APIs are up to 100 times more likely to suffer from chronic hepatitis B infection and four times more likely to die from liver cancer compared with the general population.

The San Francisco Hep B Free campaign put San Francisco at the forefront of America in fighting chronic hepatitis. It was the largest, most intensive healthcare campaign for Asian and Pacific Islanders in the U.S. This initiative received national attention and is being looked to as a model by the California legislature. Mayor Gavin Newsom, Assemblywoman Fiona Ma and Supervisor Ed Jew lead the effort, partnering with more than 50 healthcare and Asian Pacific Islander (API) organizations. The San Francisco Board of Supervisors and San Francisco Health Commission passed unanimous resolutions supporting San Francisco Hep B Free.

Kaiser Permanente, San Francisco Medical Center was asked to present the first Hep B conferences. Gayle Akins, Kaiser Permanente CME department produced the accredited conferences on Hepatitis B for physicians, allied health professionals, community organizations and the public. The San Francisco Hep B Free Steering Committee was made up of the San Francisco Department of Public Health, Asian Liver Center at Stanford University, and AsianWeek Foundation. Assemblywoman Ma served as spokesperson and Honorary Chairperson.The efforts of San Francisco Hep B Free have been the model for similar efforts in other California counties, as well as Chicago, Las Vegas, Hawaii, Philadelphia, and Washington, DC.

== See also ==
- Hepatitis B
- Jade Ribbon Campaign
