= C10H14N2O5 =

The molecular formula C_{10}H_{14}N_{2}O_{5} (molar mass: 242.23 g/mol, exact mass: 242.0903 u) may refer to:

- Telbivudine
- Thymidine
