= Tuberculosis in China =

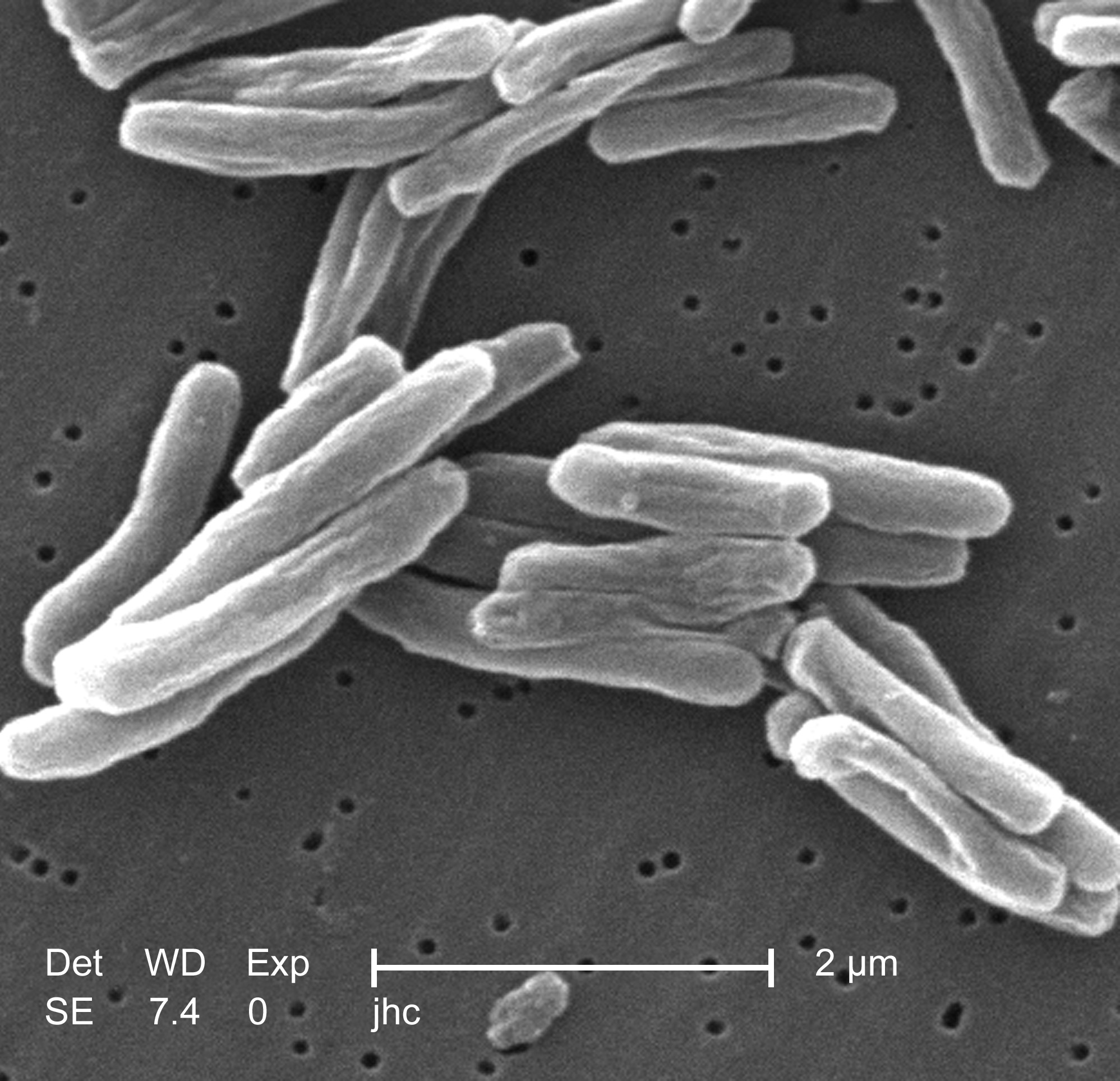
Scanning electron micrograph of Mycobacterium tuberculosis

Tuberculosis is a serious public health problem in China. China has the world's third largest cases of tuberculosis (after India and Indonesia), but progress in tuberculosis control was slow during the 1990s. Detection of tuberculosis had stagnated at around 30% of the estimated total of new cases, and multidrug-resistant tuberculosis was a major problem. These signs of inadequate tuberculosis control can be linked to a malfunctioning health system. The spread of severe acute respiratory syndrome (SARS) in 2003, brought to light substantial weaknesses in the country's public health system. After the government realized the impact that the SARS outbreak had on the country, they increased leadership in their health department. After the SARS epidemic was brought under control, the government increased its commitment and leadership to tackle public health problems and, among other efforts, increased public health funding, revised laws that concerned the control of infectious diseases, implemented the world's largest internet-based disease reporting system to improve transparency, reach and speed, and started a program to rebuild local public health facilities and national infrastructure.

These measures contributed to acceleration in efforts to control tuberculosis. By 2005, the detection of cases of tuberculosis had increased to 80% of the estimated total new cases, permitting China to achieve the 2005 global tuberculosis control targets. At the same time, specific efforts to improve tuberculosis control also contributed to strengthening of the public health system. In this case, the strengthening of the disease control program and the public health system had worked together to achieve a desired health outcome.

On February 23, 2007, the Chinese government undertook a review of the tuberculosis situation in China, which looked at the progress in tuberculosis control before the SARS epidemic, outlined the measures taken to improve the public health system after that epidemic, described how those measures contributed to the acceleration of tuberculosis control efforts, and discuss the challenges that China must address to halve the number of tuberculosis cases and deaths as part of the Millennium Development Goals (MDGs).

== Epidemiology ==
In 2007, the prevalence of TB per 100,000 people was relatively high in Asia, and was highest in sub-Saharan Africa.

China had one of the world's largest tuberculosis epidemics during the 1990s. The 1990 national tuberculosis survey reported a tuberculosis mortality of 21 per 100,000 population, and tuberculosis remained a major public health problem until the nationwide expansion of the DOTS strategy in the early 2000s.

Tuberculosis is one of China's major public health problems. According to the 2015 WHO estimates, China has the world's third largest number of tuberculosis cases, behind only India and Indonesia, comprising around 10% of the world total. Of the 37 notifiable communicable diseases in China, tuberculosis ranks first in terms of notified cases and deaths. Despite the serious nature of this disease, the country's progress in tuberculosis control was slow during the 1990s and early part of the new millennium. The estimated proportion of new cases of sputum smear-positive tuberculosis that were diagnosed and treated by the public health program—a key indicator of efforts to control tuberculosis—had stagnated at around 30%, far below the 70% target set by the WHO.

In 2003, an epidemic of severe acute respiratory syndrome (SARS) broke out in China. (See Progress of the SARS outbreak.) The spread of SARS brought to light substantial weaknesses in the country's public health system. After the SARS epidemic was brought under control, the Chinese government implemented a series of measures to strengthen its public health system. This effort coincided with acceleration in efforts to control tuberculosis. Within three years, implementation of the WHO-recommended DOTS (Directly Observed Therapy, Shortcourse) strategy to control tuberculosis increased from 68% to 100% of counties and the detection of cases of smear-positive tuberculosis by the public health system more than doubled, from 30% of new cases to 80%. Together with a tuberculosis treatment success rate of more than 90%, China achieved the 2005 global targets for tuberculosis control.

Progress of tuberculosis control in China, 1991–2005
Year	Proportion (%) of new smear-positive TB cases successfully treated	Estimated proportion (%) of all new smear-positive TB cases detected	Proportion (%) of counties implementing the WHO-recommended DOTS strategy
1991	69	4	5
1992	75	7	7
1993	79	10	19
1994	88	14	48
1995	92	21	58
1996	94	25	60
1997	94	26	61
1998	93	27	62
1999	92	28	63
2000	92	30	63
2001	91	29	65
2002	91	26	64
2003	92	44	77
2004	90	63	89
2005	90	80	100

=== Focusing on vulnerable groups ===
One group of special concern are work migrants, most often poor men, who leave the countryside to join the wage economy in towns and cities all over China. Some come from areas such as Henan Province where huge numbers of peasants were infected with HIV from scandalous plasma-donor practices in the 1990s. Many male migrants are at risk of unprotected sex when away from home. And men are also at higher risk of tuberculosis than women in China because the male-to-female ratio of adults with pulmonary tuberculosis is about 2:1 or more, reflecting a real risk excess rather than differential detection or notification. So several factors converge in young male migrant workers to put them at risk of both HIV and tuberculosis, and this convergence has been of great concern. With this "floating" migrant population making up 10% of the total being poorer and having more tuberculosis than average, China has far more than its share of tuberculosis (disease burden) in the world. This problem is compounded because China's internal work migrants often live and work in circumstances that promote transmission of tuberculosis and impede its diagnosis and treatment. They are usually so poor that the cost of adequate diagnosis and treatment is prohibitively expensive. Indeed, they may not be able to get treated at all unless they return to their home village in the poor interior, because subsidized management of tuberculosis (and other social welfare) is only available through facilities in the area where they were registered at birth. Those born in rural zones are not allowed to switch registration to become urban residents. They have been allowed to leave their area (temporarily) or work since 1992 and now number more than 100 million. China's rapid economic growth depends on them, but if they get tuberculosis, they have to return home for treatment.

Going home for rural healthcare in China is not ideal either. Over the past 30 years, that part of the health system has run down because government funding has fallen while everything else has become more expensive. Health facilities attempted to make up shortfalls by charging ever larger fees for diagnosis and treatment, especially for a difficult disease like tuberculosis. In China today, patients' payments keep the health services running and the medical staff have been encouraged to supply profitable health goods and services, especially drugs. Their own jobs depend on adequate operational funds, which are largely generated through user fees. Meanwhile, over the same 30 years, the socialist system of universal rural health-insurance collapsed and was not replaced apart from some pilot tests of an under-resourced community-based scheme in the 1990s. Until recently, virtually all rural residents, 900 million in all, had no health insurance at all. This situation will change if the current experiments with community-based health-insurance succeed and are then adopted nationally, but in the meantime as many as 10% of rural households have catastrophic medical payments (exceeding 40% of their disposable income) every year.

== Control and prevention ==
=== Tuberculosis control before SARS ===
Tuberculosis control has been a part of China's public health program since the 1950s. China developed and implemented two five-year national plans in the 1980s and one 10-year plan in the 1990s to control tuberculosis. On the basis of national surveys in 1979 and 1990, the prevalence of tuberculosis fell by an average of 3.3% every year during the 1980s. In the 1990s, the government implemented two major tuberculosis control projects as part of its 10-year plan to control tuberculosis.

The first, funded in part by the World Bank loan of $58.2 million, covered half of China's population and implemented the DOTS strategy in 13 provinces between 1992 and 2001. The second used limited funding from the Ministry of Health to subsidize treatment for patients in an extra 10–15% of the population.

The project funded by the World Bank led to several important achievements. Nearly 1.5 million cases of smear-positive tuberculosis were diagnosed and cured. A large cadre of healthcare workers was trained in the fundamental elements of DOTS, firmly establishing these methods as the national strategy for tuberculosis control. Most importantly, on the basis of results from the 2000 national tuberculosis survey, there was a 36% reduction in disease prevalence between 1990 and 2000 in the half of China that implemented the projects.

Despite these achievements, there were signs of difficulties elsewhere in the country's tuberculosis control program. In the half of China that did not implement the project funded by the World Bank, the prevalence of tuberculosis did not fall during the 1990s. Thus, the fall in tuberculosis prevalence for the entire country slowed to 2.5% per year during the 1990s. The 2000 national tuberculosis survey revealed that one in ten patients with tuberculosis had multi-drug resistant (MDR) disease—i.e., resistant to both isoniazid and rifampicin. Other studies confirmed a serious epidemic of MDR tuberculosis in several Chinese provinces, with rates of multidrug resistance in previously untreated cases that were five to ten times higher than the global mean.

The inadequate control of tuberculosis can be linked to a malfunctioning health system. From 1978 to 2002, the government's share of total health expenditure fell from 32% to 16%. This reduction forced many Chinese health-care facilities and providers to focus on the generation of revenue, with little concern for public health. Hospitals and clinics essentially functioned (and continue to function) as for-profit entities. In 2000, nearly 90% of patients with tuberculosis initiated their diagnostic and treatment process in hospitals and non-public health-care facilities, where they were given tests and drugs as long as they could pay. Many patients who improved or ran out of money discontinued treatment. Thus, only 20% of patients with tuberculosis treated outside the public health system took their tuberculosis medications regularly in 2000. Such irregular treatment breeds drug-resistant tuberculosis.

For those patients with tuberculosis who eventually ended up in the public health system, the problems did not end there. Governmental funding for public health had also declined over the years. In 2002, only about 41% of funding for the country's Centers for Disease Control and Prevention (CDC) institutions came from the government. To make ends meet, local CDCs concentrated on the generation of revenue. There was little incentive to undertake tuberculosis control activities, which are labor-intensive and create little income. Even in areas where government subsidies support free diagnosis and treatment of tuberculosis, many CDCs continue to charge patients for ancillary tests and drugs, some of which are of questionable benefit.

Against this backdrop, the central government began efforts to revitalise its tuberculosis control program in 2000. Most important was the increased political commitment to tackle tuberculosis. In March 2000, the Minister of Health Zhang Wenkang and Vice-Minister of Finance Gao Qiang attended the Ministerial Conference on Tuberculosis and Sustainable Development in Amsterdam, where they committed to strengthen the country's efforts to control tuberculosis. In December 2000, the State Council of China held a nationwide video-teleconference on tuberculosis. Vice-Premier Li Lanqing gave explicit instructions to strengthen the tuberculosis control effort. In October 2001, the government issued the second 10-year plan (2001–2010) to control tuberculosis. In 2002, the central government increased its funding for tuberculosis from US$300 000 per year to $4.8 million per year.

The government also organised a partnership with international agencies to support the country's efforts to control tuberculosis. Early in 2002, the government signed a seven-year, $104 million loan with the World Bank, which included blended grant funding from the UK's Department for International Development; also, the Japanese government began to provide free antituberculosis drugs in 12 provinces. In late 2002, China received a $48 million grant from the Global Fund to fight AIDS, Tuberculosis and Malaria to tackle tuberculosis. The Damien Foundation Belgium and the Canadian International Development Agency have supported efforts to control tuberculosis in several provinces. WHO served as the lead technical agency, providing policy and technical support to the national tuberculosis program. WHO sent an in-country adviser and many short-term consultants; the KNCV Tuberculosis Foundation also provided valuable technical support. By late 2002, with increased governmental and international support, DOTS began to expand to all provinces.

=== Efforts to control tuberculosis after SARS ===
Early in 2003, the SARS epidemic brought China to a virtual standstill. Most tuberculosis control activities came to a stop. However, after the SARS epidemic had been successfully controlled, tuberculosis control activities picked up rapidly in the second half of the year. By the end of 2003, 43% of the estimated total new cases of smear-positive tuberculosis had been diagnosed and treated in the country's DOTS program. With further acceleration of tuberculosis control efforts, 64% and 80% of these cases were diagnosed and treated in 2004 and 2005, respectively. The acceleration of efforts to control tuberculosis after the SARS epidemic would not have been possible if the government had not laid the foundation to revitalize the tuberculosis control program before 2003. However, the gains in tuberculosis control after SARS also resulted from measures to improve the public health system.

The first of the key measures that have been implemented in the three years since the SARS crisis ended was greatly increased commitment and leadership from the government to tackle public health problems. During the SARS epidemic, governmental and communist party leaders at all levels—from Paramount leader Hu Jintao, Premier Wen Jiabo and members of the State Council down to village leaders—were involved in tackling a single public-health issue. The epidemic and its eventual control convinced Chinese leaders that the government should be much more involved in addressing public-health problems. After the SARS epidemic, the State Council developed a mechanism to oversee public-health emergencies directly. The State Council has also involved itself with other pressing public-health challenges, including HIV/AIDS, avian influenza, occupational safety, and environmental health.

The increased political commitment to public health has benefited tuberculosis control. In March 2004, Vice-Minister of Health Wang Longde attended the second Stop TB Partners' Forum in New Delhi, India, and made a commitment on behalf of the government to achieve the 2005 global targets for tuberculosis control. In June 2004, the State Council held a video-teleconference with provincial Vice-Governors to discuss steps to accelerate efforts to control tuberculosis. The Ministry of Health identified 12 provinces with more than 85% of the "missing" cases needed to reach the 70% target for case detection in China and sent monitoring teams to these provinces to identify and solve existing problems. In December 2004, Vice-Minister Wang Longde and Shigeru Omi, WHO Regional Director of the Western Pacific, co-chaired a high-level tuberculosis meeting in China. Governmental leaders from the 12 provinces participated, including the Vice-Governors from eight provinces.

In addition to increased involvement and commitment, the central government has increased funding for public health from $835 million in 2002 to $1.44 billion in 2004. Over this period, the proportion of total CDC funding provided by the government increased from 40.7% to 47.1%, reversing a downward trend. The central government increased funding for four priority communicable diseases in particular—HIV/AIDS, tuberculosis, schistosomiasis, and hepatitis B. Tuberculosis funding increased by more than seven times during this period (reaching $36 million in 2005) and contributed to 26% of the total funding available for the national tuberculosis control program in 2005. The additional funding has been used to expand health promotion activities, to provide financial incentives to village workers to find and treat tuberculosis, and to provide free treatment for people with smear-negative pulmonary tuberculosis for the first time.

Furthermore, the central government revised the law on the control of infectious diseases in March 2004. The revision provides instructions to tackle infectious-disease outbreaks, improve the reporting of infectious diseases, implement interventions to control the spread of such diseases, provide clinical services, and fund the control of infectious diseases. This law directly benefited tuberculosis control by addressing the under-reporting of tuberculosis by health facilities. Tuberculosis now has to be reported to local public-health authorities within 24 hours. Because failure to report is now a crime, hospitals have begun to take the reporting of tuberculosis very seriously.

In January 2004, the Ministry of Health implemented the world's largest internet-based communicable-disease reporting system. This system addressed the delays and incomplete reporting of communicable diseases, which were most evident during the SARS epidemic, when governmental authorities could not quickly assess the extent of the epidemic. At the end of 2005, 93% of 19,716 health facilities at and above the county-level and 66% of 38,518 township-level health facilities were reporting the country's 37 notifiable diseases through this system. The mean length of time to report from a county-level health facility to the central level has been reduced from 29 days to 1 day.

With this new internet-based reporting system, individuals involved in tuberculosis control can rapidly identify cases of tuberculosis—both confirmed and suspected—in China's vast hospital system for the first time. This information is being used to trace patients with tuberculosis and ensure their proper diagnosis and treatment. In 2004, 447,777 suspected or confirmed cases of tuberculosis were reported from hospitals. This number increased to 686,742 in 2005 as more hospitals implemented this system; almost 64% of these patients were successfully followed up. On the basis of preliminary analysis by the China CDC, 25% of all cases of tuberculosis in 2005 were initially reported from hospitals via the internet.

The government has also started a massive program to rebuild local public-health facilities. SARS revealed that public-health facilities were largely outdated and inadequate to tackle existing public-health problems, not to mention addressing new or emerging challenges. The government is currently investing $1.3 billion to rebuild 2448 CDC facilities in 27 provinces. When completed, more than 80% of the country's CDC facilities will be new. The central government will provide 28% of the needed funding, with the rest coming from governments at various levels. However, China's poorer western provinces will receive preferential support, with 65% of the needed funding coming from the central government. Tuberculosis control programs will directly benefit from this approach, since more than 80% of China's tuberculosis dispensaries are located in local CDC facilities.

Although a strengthened public-health system has accelerated the national tuberculosis control effort, progress in tuberculosis control has also strengthened the public-health system. In terms of policy, the national tuberculosis control program has clear targets and well-defined technical policies based on the DOTS strategy. National and international partners work in a cohesive manner toward the same targets, with the same implementation framework. Other public-health programs are learning from this successful model. In financial terms, funding from different partners is harmonized under one financing plan with clear funding needs and gaps—another model for other programs. Furthermore, the failure to control tuberculosis in the past—when tuberculosis services were not free—and the success in tuberculosis control over the past few years—when tuberculosis services have been free—have provided policymakers with arguments to increase funding for public health from the government. With regard to management, several features of DOTS—e.g., directly observed therapy to manage treatment of patients and the management of logistics and drugs—are now used to tackle HIV/AIDS and in other public-health programs. Furthermore, although many public-health workers are being trained to implement DOTS, setbacks caused by inadequate numbers of trained workers have shown governmental leaders the importance of such resources in public health, and thus they have increased planning for them. In terms of information systems, the tuberculosis program's quarterly recording and reporting system has long been a model for other disease control programs. With the new internet-based reporting system for communicable diseases, the tuberculosis program leads the way in the use of information to improve public-health outcomes. Finally, the model of collaboration between hospitals and CDC facilities provided by the tuberculosis control program is one of the best examples to date of how hospitals should be involved in the prevention and control of infectious diseases, and has influenced the development of new policies that involve hospitals in the work of public health.

Tuberculosis in China was most effectively prevented through spreading awareness. Information was widely spread throughout China, mainly throughout the form of government funded free pamphlets, handed out at children's sporting events.

=== 2009-2014 program ===
A new five-year initiative program, announced on 1 April 2009, aims to use innovative technologies to improve the detection and treatment of tuberculosis (TB) in China. Cutting edge diagnostic tests, drug regimens that reduce the number of pills a patient needs to take, and innovative ways of ensuring patients take their drugs—such as mobile phone text messaging—are to be rolled out under a program led by the Chinese Ministry of Health. It will be implemented in five designated provinces and one municipality—covering 20 million people at risk of TB.

The proposed diagnostic tools will include the use of LED microscopes and DNA-based diagnosis. Using LEDs rather than standard phosphorescent lights in microscopes forms a clearer image and improves TB detection rates in patients' sputum from 50 to 65 per cent. And DNA testing, which can determine which strains of Mycobacterium tuberculosis are present in sputum has 98 per cent accuracy and can be used to detect drug-resistant strains in as little as a day. DNA-based diagnosis is also cost-effective. As well as diagnosis, new management methods such as mobile phone text messaging and medicine kits with built-in reminder alarms will be used to enhance patients' drug compliance. Drug combinations—where different drugs are combined in the same pill—will also be used to reduce the number of pills a patient has to take from around 13 to three or four a day.

After two-and-a-half years effective interventions will be scaled up. Some 20 cities covering 100 million people should be included by the end of the fifth year of the program, funded by a US$33 million grant from the Bill & Melinda Gates Foundation.

== Reviewing of strategy ==
Although China achieved the 2005 global targets for tuberculosis control, these are only targets for implementation and monitoring in the national and international efforts to control tuberculosis. More important are the targets of halving the prevalence of, and mortality from, tuberculosis. Countries in the Western Pacific region committed to these targets in 1999, as did the wider international community as part of the MDGs.

To achieve these targets, China needs to address existing challenges to its efforts to control tuberculosis. Foremost is the serious epidemic of MDR tuberculosis. WHO estimates that a third of the world's cases of MDR tuberculosis are in China, even though the country has only 15% of the global burden of tuberculosis. The recent expansion of DOTS should help to limit the development of MDR tuberculosis. But reduction of the existing burden of multidrug resistance will take time, especially since poor-quality DOTS services in some areas and inappropriate treatment of tuberculosis in parts of the hospital system continue to generate new cases of MDR tuberculosis.

The absence of a sound financing mechanism to fully fund tuberculosis services is a further problem. Although funding for tuberculosis services is at its highest level ever, the Ministry of Health estimates that the national tuberculosis control program still had a 23% funding gap in 2005. Additionally, more than a quarter of current funding comes from external grants and loans, making sustainable funding a major challenge.

Another challenge is to make tuberculosis services accessible to the entire population. Although China has a policy of free tuberculosis services, in most places these are available only to permanent residents in a particular community. Urban migrants, who have relocated from poor rural areas to seek a better livelihood, are not eligible for such free services. These vulnerable, predominantly young migrants—now numbering more than 150 million—tend to live and work in crowded environments and are unlikely to seek medical care when they become ill. Such individuals contribute to the spread of tuberculosis, HIV infection, and other infectious diseases within urban centers. The growing epidemic of co-infection with tuberculosis and HIV if left unchecked will substantially increase the number of tuberculosis cases and deaths.

A further difficulty is presented by the shortage of trained health-care workers for tuberculosis control. CDC facilities are being rebuilt across the country but many are staffed inadequately or by poorly trained and unmotivated health-care workers. Finally, and perhaps most importantly, is the challenge of sustaining and further increasing long-term governmental commitment to the control of tuberculosis, which is essential to tackle the other challenges.

China is developing tuberculosis-specific policies and interventions to address these challenges. The new five-year implementation plan of the national tuberculosis control program (2006–2010) has incorporated key elements of the new Stop TB Strategy and the second Global Plan to Stop TB. These include a programmatic approach to diagnosis and treatment of MDR tuberculosis, tuberculosis control in migrants, and tuberculosis/HIV collaborative activities. Additionally, the five-year plan for implementation of the national HIV/AIDS program aims to stem the rise of the HIV/AIDS epidemic by expanding prevention, treatment, and care activities. Implementation of these new policies and interventions will require a substantial increase in both domestic resources and international support, especially for poor areas in China's central-western provinces.

Although disease-specific interventions are important, further strengthening of the public-health system will be needed if China is to halve the prevalence of tuberculosis and the number of deaths caused by the disease. To increase access, a package of essential public-health services for rural inhabitants and urban migrants should be provided with governmental subsidies. This package should include services for at least tuberculosis, immunisation, HIV/AIDS, sexually transmitted infections, and maternal and child health. The government must also address the warped incentives in hospitals that encourage the generation of profits from drugs, tests, and state-of-the-art technologies. This profit generation fuels the inappropriate diagnosis and treatment of many diseases, including tuberculosis. Finally, the government should provide operational costs for public-health services and full salaries for health-care workers, especially at and below the county level, where most of the rural population live. The number of staff needed for essential public-health functions should be carefully calculated, and public-health workers must be given fair pay. Without this, the development and maintenance of a motivated and skilled public-health workforce to meet the challenges of the 21st century will be difficult.

Ultimately, China's progress in the control of tuberculosis and public-health reform will depend on the degree of political commitment to address these challenges. In this regard, the indication by Premier Wen Jiabao, speaking at the National People's Congress in March 2006, that public health is a key component of the country's 11th five-year development plan is very encouraging. He highlighted the need to improve rural and urban health services, making them affordable for all, and specifically mentioned the need to control HIV/AIDS, tuberculosis, and schistosomiasis. With increased governmental commitment and funding to improve public health, China has reason to believe that the prevalence of tuberculosis and deaths caused by the disease can be halved within the next decade.

In conclusion, the Chinese experience has shown that investment in both control programs and health systems—rather than investment in one or the other alone—was needed, and indeed essential, to achieve the 2005 global targets for tuberculosis, and provides an example for developing countries scaling-up efforts to achieve health-related MDGs.

== See also ==
China-related

- Public health in the People's Republic of China
- Medicine in China
- Pharmaceutical industry in China

Tuberculosis-related

- 2007 tuberculosis scare
- ATC code J04 Drugs for treatment of TB
- Latent tuberculosis
- Mycobacterium Tuberculosis Structural Genomics Consortium
- National Center for HIV, STD, and TB Prevention
- Nontuberculous mycobacteria
- Overcrowding
- Philip D'Arcy Hart
- Tuberculosis in history and art
- UNITAID
- Nosocomial infection
