= Tuberculosis Structural Genomics Consortium =

International science consortium

The TB Structural Genomics Consortium (TBSGC) is a worldwide consortium of scientists developing a foundation for tuberculosis diagnosis and treatment by determining the three-dimensional structures of proteins from M. tuberculosis founded in 2000 as a part of the Protein Structure Initiative. The consortium seeks to solve structures of proteins that are of great interest to the TB biology community. A major goal of the consortium is to have a putative function for every ORF in the TB genome.

== Activities ==
As of June 2006, 82 TB protein structures have been determined, 15 since January 1, 2006. The database of linked structural and functional information that has been constructed using this information can form a lasting basis for understanding M. tuberculosis pathogenesis and for structure-based drug design.

As of June 2006, the TB Structural Genomics Consortium consists of 430 active members in 148 laboratories from 83 institutions across 15 countries. Consortium laboratories are collectively responsible for 3.3% of all protein structures in the protein data bank and have extensive records of methods development. Consortium members have carried out a pilot project on the structural genomics of a hyperthermophile that has identified bottlenecks in the structure determination process and resulted in the development of methodologies for high-throughput structure determination and analysis. The consortium has five core facilities (located at Lawrence Livermore National Laboratory, Los Alamos National Lab, Lawrence Berkeley National Laboratory, University of California, Los Angeles and Texas A&M University) that carry out an increasing fraction of routine tasks such as protein production, crystallization and X-ray data collection. Members of the consortium improve their productivity by sending materials to these facilities, receiving the resulting products or data, and reporting this activity to the database. This helps to minimize redundant pursuits of targets. This structural and functional information is publicly available.

The five core facilities available to consortium members provide services for cloning, expression, and purification of proteins as well as crystallization and subsequent diffraction and data analysis of protein crystals. Furthermore, a database has been developed to record all activity done within the consortium. This database also tracks the movement of materials between members and allows the up to the minute status to be recorded and available to all other members.
