= Open protein structure annotation network =

Genomics database

TOPSAN

Content
- Description: Collaborative annotation environment for structural genomics

Contact
- Research center: Sanford-Burnham Medical Research Institute
- Laboratory: Joint Center for Structural Genomics
- Authors: Dana Weekes
- Primary citation: Weekes & al. (2010)
- Release date: 2010

Access
- Website: http://www.topsan.org

The Open Protein Structure Annotation Network (TOPSAN) is a wiki designed to collect, share and distribute information about protein three-dimensional structures The site runs on the MindTouch software.

== See also ==
- Protein structure
