= Asian Liver Center =

Non-profit organization in California, US

The Asian Liver Center is a non-profit organization at Stanford University, United States, that researches the high incidence of hepatitis B and liver cancer in Asians and Asian Americans. The Asian Liver Center (ALC) was founded in 1996 to spearhead educational outreach and advocacy efforts in the areas of hepatitis B and liver cancer prevention and treatment, serves as a resource for both the general public and health practitioners, and implements clinical and research programs.

== History ==
The Asian Liver Center was founded in 1996 by Dr. Samuel So. Since its establishment in 1996, ALC has become a national and international leader in the fight against hepatitis B and liver cancer. It uses the help of a network of governmental and nongovernmental agencies, state and federal legislators, private corporations and foundations, and community partners.

== Outreach and education ==
The key to winning the fight against hepatitis B and liver cancer is prevention, and prevention begins with outreach and education. The Asian Liver Center is dedicated to serving the Asian community through a variety of outreach and education programs. A HBV safe and effective vaccine is available, offering protection from the hepatitis B virus (HBV), but many API are not vaccinated because they are not aware of the problem and its prevalence in their community.

ALC participates in community events throughout the Bay Area, providing screenings and low-cost vaccinations, hosting educational booths and games, speaking to health care providers and developing workshops to spread awareness about hepatitis B and liver cancer. The outreach section of the ALC website gives details of screenings, conferences, community events, advocacy efforts, partnerships, ongoing projects, and contests. The education section of the site includes information about hepatitis B, liver cancer, vaccination and blood tests as well as patient testimonials and resources for health care providers.

== Advocacy ==
ALC supports the expansion of the Jade Ribbon Campaign. In California, the Asian Liver Center is working with Assemblywoman Fiona Ma to pass Assembly Bill 158, which will provide care for all uninsured and under-insured people who are chronically infected with hepatitis B, with no raise in taxes. Nationally, the Asian Liver Center worked with Congressman Mike Honda co-sponsored a bill early in 2006 to designate the first National Hepatitis B Awareness Week in May 2006. In April 2004, the Jade Ribbon Campaign was launched by the ALC in China in partnership with the China Foundation for Hepatitis Prevention and Control at the China National Hepatitis Conference. The Asian Liver Center advocates for laws that prevent hepatitis B discrimination, strategies to provide access to affordable screenings, vaccinations and treatment, and partnerships to unite against HBV and liver cancer.

== Research ==
Research in liver cancer has generally received low priority for federal funding in this country, contributing to the lack of effective treatment for chronically infected individuals. The ALC research program is looking for novel approaches to increase the efficacy of diagnosis, prognosis, and treatment through the development of a liver cancer research program with an emphasis on liver cancer genomics, biomarkers, molecular targets, and investigational anti-tumor agents.

ALC is working on a perinatal hepatitis B prevention initiative to design and implement strategies to prevent mother-to-child transmission of hepatitis B in Alameda and Santa Clara counties, where the combined population of about 3.2 million experiences some of the highest rates of chronic HBV and liver cancer in the US.

== Jade Ribbon campaign ==
The Jade Ribbon Campaign (JRC) was launched by the Asian Liver Center (ALC) at Stanford University in May 2001 during Asian Pacific American Heritage Month to help spread awareness internationally about hepatitis B (HBV) and liver cancer in Asian and Pacific Islander (API) communities.

The objective of the Jade Ribbon Campaign is to eradicate HBV worldwide; and to reduce the incidence and mortality associated with liver cancer. Considered to be the essence of heaven and earth, Jade is believed in many Asian cultures to bring good luck and longevity while deflecting negativity. Folded like the Chinese character “人” (ren) meaning "person" or "people," the Jade Ribbon symbolizes the spirit of the campaign in bringing the Asian and global community together to combat the epidemic.

Since the campaign's founding, the Asian Liver Center (ALC) has been spearheading the Jade Ribbon Campaign through public service announcements in media such as newspapers, magazines, TV, radio, billboard, and buses targeting communities with large API populations. The ALC holds seminars for health professionals and the public, cultural fairs, conferences, and HBV screening/vaccination events.
