= LIVERight =

LIVERight is the first 5K run/walk to raise awareness about hepatitis B and liver cancer. The goal of LIVERight was not only to raise money for outreach efforts, but more importantly to educate and increase awareness of this pressing public health issue. Educational displays, informational booths and of course signs were unique and significant components to the event. The education allowed participants to learn more about hepatitis B prevention and treatment, as well as hear the real stories about the lives lost and won to liver cancer.

== About LIVERight ==
The LIVERight concept began at the 2nd annual Youth Leadership Conference on Asian and Pacific Islander Health in 2004, a CDC funded event organized by the Asian Liver Center at Stanford University. High school students were given a Team Challenge to create a campaign/event for raising awareness about hepatitis B, and LIVERight was born. The words "Liver" and "Right" together emphasize the importance of liver health. From this concept, LIVERight bracelets and the LIVERight 5K run/walk emerged.

Adrian Elkins inspired the Asian Liver Center at Stanford University to start LIVERight, a 5K Run/Walk to raise awareness about hepatitis B and liver cancer in the Asian Pacific Islander community.

On 30 April 2005 in San Francisco's Golden Gate Park, the Asian Liver Center and the Answer to Cancer Foundation hosted LIVERight.

On 11 November 2006, the 2nd annual LIVERight on the go! was held at Stanford's Sand Hill Fields. The community event had 700 registered participants and 100 volunteers, and raised over $135,000.

LIVERight '09 was held on Saturday, May 2, 2009 at Golden Gate Park in San Francisco, California. Over 400 runners registered and raised over $100,000 to fight liver cancer and hepatitis B.

== Answer to Cancer ==
The Answer to Cancer (A2C) run was founded by Adrian Elkins, a 20-year-old student at Southern Oregon University who was diagnosed with liver cancer in 2002. Had he known during his childhood that his ethnicity and chronic hepatitis B infection increased his chance of developing liver cancer by 100%, he would have been regularly monitored for liver damage. He had no idea that hepatitis B—a disease he contracted at birth in Calcutta, India—causes 80% of the world's liver cancer cases. Adrian battled his disease for ten months, working tirelessly to organize an event to raise money for liver cancer research. Adrian saw the first-ever A2C run take place on 8 August 2003. Thanks to the generous support of friends, families and numerous companies, the 2003 Answer to Cancer Race was able to raise more than $20,000 for three charities and reach out to more than 240 participants. Adrian died only eight days after this first race.
