= Protein Structure Initiative =

PSI logo

The Protein Structure Initiative (PSI) was a USA based project that aimed at accelerating discovery in structural genomics and contribute to understanding biological function. Funded by the U.S. National Institute of General Medical Sciences (NIGMS) between 2000 and 2015, its aim was to reduce the cost and time required to determine three-dimensional protein structures and to develop techniques for solving challenging problems in structural biology, including membrane proteins. Over a dozen research centers have been supported by the PSI for work in building and maintaining high-throughput structural genomics pipelines, developing computational protein structure prediction methods, organizing and disseminating information generated by the PSI, and applying high-throughput structure determination to study a broad range of important biological and biomedical problems.

The project has been organized into three separate phases. The first phase of the Protein Structure Initiative (PSI-1) spanned from 2000 to 2005, and was dedicated to demonstrating the feasibility of high-throughput structure determination, solving unique protein structures, and preparing for a subsequent production phase. The second phase, PSI-2, focused on implementing the high-throughput structure determination methods developed in PSI-1, as well as homology modeling and addressing bottlenecks like modeling membrane proteins. The third phase, PSI:Biology, began in 2010 and consisted of networks of investigators applying high-throughput structure determination to study a broad range of biological and biomedical problems. PSI program ended on 7/1/2015, even that some of the PSI centers continue structure determination supported by other funding mechanisms.

== Phase 1 ==
The first phase of the Protein Structure Initiative (PSI-1) lasted from June 2000 until September 2005, and had a budget of $270 million funded primarily by NIGMS with support from the National Institute of Allergy and Infectious Diseases. PSI-1 saw the establishment of nine pilot centers focusing on structural genomics studies of a range of organisms, including Arabidopsis thaliana, Caenorhabditis elegans and Mycobacterium tuberculosis. During this five-year period over 1,100 protein structures were determined, over 700 of which were classified as "unique" due to their < 30% sequence similarity with other known protein structures.

The primary goal of PSI-1, to develop methods to streamline the structure determination process, resulted in an array of technical advances. Several methods developed during PSI-1 enhanced expression of recombinant proteins in systems like Escherichia coli, Pichia pastoris and insect cell lines. New streamlined approaches to cell cloning, expression and protein purification were also introduced, in which robotics and software platforms were integrated into the protein production pipeline to minimize required manpower, increase speed, and lower costs.

== Phase 2 ==
The second phase of the Protein Structure Initiative (PSI-2) lasted from July 2005 to June 2010. Its goal was to use methods introduced in PSI-1 to determine a large number of proteins and continue development in streamlining the structural genomics pipeline. PSI-2 had a five-year budget of $325 million provided by NIGMS with support from the National Center for Research Resources. By the end of this phase, the Protein Structure Initiative had solved over 4,800 protein structures; over 4,100 of these were unique.

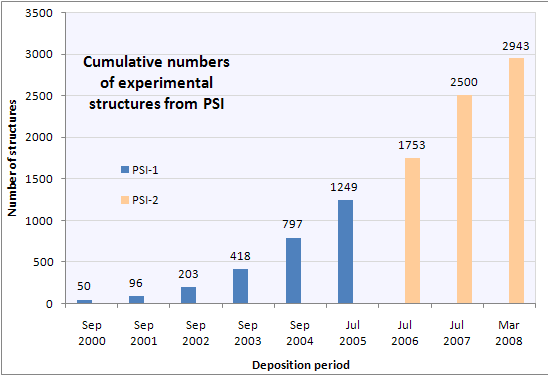
Bar chart showing growth over time of protein structures deposited by the Protein Structure Initiative into the Protein Data Bank

The number of sponsored research centers grew to 14 during PSI-2. Four centers were selected as Large Scale centers, with a mandate to place 15% effort on targets nominated by the broader research community, 15% on targets of biomedical relevance, and 70% on broad structural coverage; these centers were the Joint Center for Structural Genomics (JCSG), the Midwest Center for Structural Genomics (MCSG), the Northeast Structural Genomics Consortium (NESG), and the New York SGX Research Center for Structural Genomics (NYSGXRC). The new centers participating in PSI-2 included four specialized centers: Accelerated Technologies Center for Gene to 3D Structure (ATCG3D), the Center for Eukaryotic Structural Genomics (CESG), the Center for High-Throughput Structural Biology (CHTSB), a branch of the Structural Genomics of Pathogenic Protozoa Consortium taking that institution's place), the Center for Structures of Membrane Proteins (CSMP), and the New York Consortium on Membrane Protein Structure (NYCOMPS). Two homology modeling centers, the Joint Center for Molecular Modeling (JCMM) and New Methods for High-Resolution Comparative Modeling (NMHRCM) were also added, as well as two resource centers, the PSI Materials Repository (PSI-MR) and the PSI Structural Biology Knowledgebase (SBKB). The TB Structural Genomics Consortium was removed from the roster of supported research centers in the transition from PSI-1 to PSI-2.

Originally launched in February 2008, the SBKB is a free resource that provides information on protein sequence and keyword searching, as well as modules describing target selection, experimental protocols, structure models, functional annotation, metrics on overall progress, and updates on structure determination technology. Like the PDB, it is directed by Dr. Helen M. Berman and hosted at Rutgers University.

The PSI Materials Repository, established in 2006 at the Harvard Institute of Proteomics, stores and ships PSI-generated plasmid clones. Clones are sequence-verified, annotated and stored in the DNASU Plasmid Repository, currently located at the Biodesign Institute at Arizona State University. As of September 2011, there are over 50,000 PSI-generated plasmid clones and empty vectors available for request through DNASU in addition to over 147,000 clones generated from non-PSI sources. Plasmids are distributed to researchers worldwide. Now called the PSI:Biology Materials Repository, this resource has a five-year budget of $5.4 million and is under the direction of Dr. Joshua LaBaer, who moved to Arizona State University in the middle of 2009, taking the PSI:Biology-MR with him.

== Phase 3 ==
The third phase of the PSI was called PSI:Biology and was intended to reflect the emphasis on the biological relevance of the work. During this phase, highly organized networks of investigators were applying the new paradigm of high-throughput structure determination, which was successfully developed during the earlier phases of the PSI, to study a broad range of important biological and biomedical problems. The network included centers for high-throughput structure determination, centers for membrane protein structure determination, consortia for high-throughput-enabled structural biology partnerships, the SBKB and the PSI-MR. In September 2013 NIH announced that PSI would not be renewed after its third phase would end in 2015.

== Impact ==
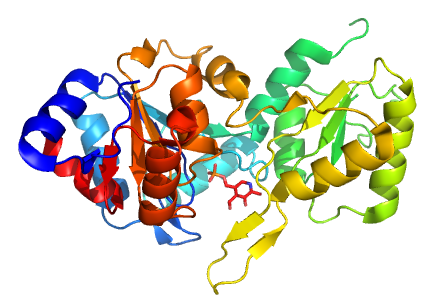
PDB structure 2p69, one of the protein structures solved by the New York SGX Research Center for Structural Genomics, a large scale PSI center. This human phosphatase is involved in vitamin B_{6} (shown in stick diagram) metabolism .

As of January 2006, about two thirds of worldwide structural genomics (SG) output was made by PSI centers. Of these PSI contributions over 20% represented new Pfam families, compared to the non-SG average of 5%. Pfam families represent structurally distinct groups of proteins as predicted from sequenced genomes. Not targeting homologs of known structure was accomplished by using sequence comparison tools like BLAST and PSI-BLAST. Like the difference in novelty as determined by discovery of new Pfam families, the PSI also discovered more SCOP folds and superfamilies than non-SG efforts. In 2006, 16% of structures solved by the PSI represented new SCOP folds and superfamilies, while the non-SG average was 4%. Solving such novel structures reflects increased coverage of protein fold space, one of the PSI's main goals. Determining the structure a novel protein allows homology modeling to more accurately predict the fold of other proteins in the same structural family.

While most of the structures solved by the four large-scale PSI centers lack functional annotation, many of the remaining PSI centers determine structures for proteins with known biological function. The TB Structural Genomics Consortium, for example, focused exclusively on functionally characterized proteins. During its term in PSI-1, it deposited structures for over 70 unique proteins from Mycobacterium tuberculosis, which represented more than 35% of total unique M. tuberculosis structures solved through 2007. In following with its biomedical theme to increase coverage of phosphotomes, the NYSGXRC has determined structures for about 10% of all human phosphatases.

The PSI consortia have provided the overwhelming majority of targets for the Critical Assessment of Techniques for Protein Structure Prediction (CASP), a community-wide, biannual experiment to determine the state and progress of protein structure prediction.

A major goal during the PSI:Biology phase is to utilize the high-throughput methods developed during the initiative's first decade to generate protein structures for functional studies, broadening the PSI's biomedical impact. It is also expected to advance knowledge and understanding of membrane proteins.

== Criticism ==
The PSI has received notable criticism from the structural biology community. Among these charges is that the main product of the PSI – PDB files of proteins' atomic coordinates as determined by X-ray crystallography or NMR spectroscopy – are not useful enough to biologists to justify the project's $764 million cost. Critics note that money currently spent on the PSI could have otherwise funded what they consider worthier causes:

The $60 million a year in public money that is being spent – I would say, wasted – on the PSI is enough to fund approximately 100–200 individual investigator-initiated research grants. These hypothesis-driven proposals are the lifeblood of the scientific enterprise, and as I have discussed recently in other columns, they are being sucked dry by, among other things, an increasing trend to fund large initiatives at their expense. That $60 million a year would raise the payline at a typical NIH institute by about 6 percentile points, enough to make a huge difference to peer review and to the continuance of a lot of important science.

— Gregory Petsko, PhD

A short response to this was published:

In conclusion, it should be kept in mind that scientific research, and the cutting- edge technologies that both drive and are driven by it, are constantly and rapidly evolving. Some of Petsko’s criticisms are constructive, and should be noted by policy-makers. But one should not throw the baby out with the bathwater, rather tune the scope and objectives of the PSI to the needs of the life-science community as a whole, much in the spirit of SPINE, the SGC and other European structural genomics/ proteomics projects. If such a constructive approach is adopted, we feel confident that the structural data provided by the PSI and its cousins will serve as no less valuable a resource than genome sequences.

In October 2008 the NIGMS hosted a meeting concerning the future of structural genomics efforts and invited speakers from the PSI Advisory Committee, members of the NIGMS Advisory Council, and interested scientists who had no previous involvement with the PSI. Representatives of other genomics, proteomics, and structural genomics initiatives, as well as scientists from academia, government, and industry were also included. Based on this meeting and the subsequent recommendations from the PSI Advisory Committee, a concept-clearance document was released in January 2009 describing what a third phase of the PSI might entail. Most notable was a large emphasis on partnerships and collaborations to ensure that the majority of PSI research is focused on proteins of interest to the broader research community as well as efforts to make PSI products more accessible to the research community.

Grant applications for PSI:Biology were submitted by October 29, 2009. See Phase 3 section above.
