= Needle sharing =

Practice of intravenous drug-users

Needle sharing is the practice of intravenous drug-users by which a needle or syringe is shared by multiple individuals to administer intravenous drugs such as heroin, steroids, and hormones. This is a primary vector for blood-borne diseases which can be transmitted through blood (blood-borne pathogens). People who inject drugs (PWID) are at an increased risk for Hepatitis C (HCV) and HIV due to needle sharing practices. From 1933 to 1943, malaria was spread between users in the New York City area by this method. Afterwards, the use of quinine as a cutting agent in drug mixes became more common. Harm reduction efforts including safe disposal of needles, supervised injection sites, and public education may help bring awareness on safer needle sharing practices.

== Complications ==
Blood-borne diseases are transmitted when a susceptible person uses a needle that was previously used by a person who is infected with these pathogens; hence, sharing needles with other individuals is not a safe practice. It takes one simple prick of a contaminated needle to put someone at risk of acquiring Hepatitis B, Hepatitis C, or HIV infections with Hepatitis B being the easiest to contract, followed by Hepatitis C then HIV. People who use previously used needles are at increased risk of getting infected with blood-borne pathogens such as HIV, HBV, and HCV, and spreading the infections to others. In addition to HIV, HBV, and HCV, some sexually transmitted infections (STIs) can be transmitted to uninfected individuals due to the risky injection practices.

According to CDC, in 2013, sharing syringes was the cause of HIV infection in 3,096 out of the 47,352 patients who were newly diagnosed with the disease in the United States. According to a study done by New Haven Connecticut's needle exchange program, 67.5% of the needles returned to the facility were contaminated with HIV. Their assumption was that people bringing in "street needles" were shared among other people prior to bringing them to the program. Almost 50% of people who participate in IVDU have Hepatitis C. Not only are blood borne diseases passed via needle sharing, but so are bacterial infections that can ultimately cause sepsis. Additionally, improper disposal of hospital needles can expose drug resistant organisms to the outside environment.

== Risk factors ==
Much research has been done on risk factors that may predispose an individual to needle sharing in an effort to improve the effectiveness of needle-exchange programs (NEPs) and other harm reduction programs for PWID. The barriers that contribute to rates of needle sharing include the lack of accessibility to clean needles and education about safe needle usage. In each respective country, government and cultural views towards PWID and NEPs have an impact on the resources available as demonstrated by studies done in China, France, Vietnam, and India. Within the United States, needle sharing behavior is positively correlated to individuals who are of lower socioeconomic status, younger than 45 years old, male, and unemployed. The incidence of needle sharing was found to be more prevalent in homosexual and bisexual men compared to women and heterosexual men, particularly in minority communities. People of a minority race or ethnicity are often at an increased risk of needle sharing, possibly due to lower levels of health education.

== Safe disposal of needles ==
Discarding needles in regular household trash bins endangers children, pets, janitors, and waste management services personnel; therefore, needles should be properly disposed of in a FDA-cleared sharps container that is both puncture- and leak-resistant. It is important to properly dispose of used needles because it can be difficult to tell if a needle has ever been used before. By not disposing of needles in a safe way, users may expose others or themselves to a needle stick injury. If a sharps container is not available, needles can often be brought to local law enforcement, hospitals, or drug stores for safe collection and disposal. In addition, needles can be mailed in specialized containers to a mail-back program for safe disposal. Moreover, needles can be utilized and disposed of properly in supervised injection sites. In the health care setting, use of blunt-end needles can minimize the risk of needle stick injuries.

== Harm reduction ==
NEPs, also known as syringe exchange programs (SEPs), are a form of harm reduction policy that provide new needles to persons addicted to drugs in exchange for used ones in order to help control the spread of disease. In the United States, there are three distinct prohibitions on needle exchange programs at the federal level—the Ryan White CARE Act, the Substance Abuse and Mental Health Services Administration (SAMHSA) authorization, and the 1997 Labor-Health and Human Services (HHS) Education appropriations legislation. However, many states still provide the service despite the federal legislation, especially in large cities where intravenous drug use is a major health concern. A study in New York State found that during the course of 12 months, NEP prevented roughly 87 infections of HIV by preventing needle sharing. In addition, NEP have decreased the spread of HIV by one third to two fifths.

One of the other harm reduction measurements in this regard is the Supervised Injection Sites, also known as Safe Injection Sites. In these facilities, drug users have access to new needles and they can use substances under the supervision of staff trained to prevent and treat drug overdose and trained to prevent HIV and hepatitis. Some of these sites also provide help to their clients to ease their access to drug treatment and other additional social and medical services. There are some countries around the world that have already established safe injection sites, including Australia and Canada. According to NPR, since the start of this program in Canada in 2013, these sites have supervised over 3.6 million injections and have prevented more than 6,000 overdoses. Additionally, in a cross-sectional survey performed in Glasgow from 1990 to 1996, the incidence of Hepatitis C had significantly decreased with the implementation of safe needle exchanges.

The progression of supervised injection site implementation is currently not widely accepted due to social stigma, lack of government support, and health advocacy. Continued public health education, advocacy efforts, and further research may help encourage the expansion supervised injection sites.

== See also ==
- Contaminated currency
- Needle and syringe programmes

== Sources ==
- Needle Exchange Program FAQ
- Helpern M (March 30, 1934). "Malaria among drug addicts in New York City - An epidemic of estivo-autumnal and quartan malaria among drug addicts in New York City transmitted by contaminated hypodermic syringes". Public Health Reports. 49 (13): 421. doi:10.2307/4581127. JSTOR 4581127. PMC 1440553. Reprinted as Helpern M (1976). "Malaria among drug addicts in New York City (March 30, 1934): An epidemic of aestivo-autumnal and quartan malaria among drug addicts in New York City transmitted by the use of contaminated hypodermic syringes". Public Health Reports. 91 (5): 477–479. PMC 1440553. PMID 19313398.
