= MacroModel =

Computer program

- Developer(s): Schrödinger, LLC
- Initial release: 1990; 35 years ago
- Stable release: 2021-3
- Operating system: Linux, Windows, macOS
- Platform: x64, GPGPU
- Available in: English
- Type: Computational chemistry
- License: Proprietary, Commercial software
- Website: www.schrodinger.com/products/macromodel

MacroModel is a computer program for molecular modelling of organic compounds and biopolymers. It features various chemistry force fields, plus energy minimizing algorithms, to predict geometry and relative conformational energies of molecules. MacroModel is maintained by Schrödinger, LLC.

It performs simulations in the framework of classical mechanics, also termed molecular mechanics, and can perform molecular dynamics simulations to model systems at finite temperatures using stochastic dynamics and mixed Monte Carlo algorithms. MacroModel supports Windows, Linux, macOS, Silicon Graphics (SGI) IRIX, and IBM AIX.

The Macromodel software package was first been described in the scientific literature in 1990, and has been subsequently acquired by Schrödinger, Inc. in 2000.

== Key features ==
- Implicit solvation (continuum solvation) model, Generalized Born model augmented with the hydrophobic solvent accessible surface area (SA) term (GBSA)
- Force fields: MM2, MM3, AMBER, Merck Molecular Force Field (MMFF), OPLS
- Molecular dynamics
- Free energy perturbation

== Known version history ==
- 2013: version 10.0
- 2012: version 9.9.2
- 2011: version 9.9.1
- 2010: version 9.8
- 2009: version 9.7
- 2008: version 9.6
- 2007: version 9.5
- 2006: version 9.1
- 2005: version 9.0
- 2004: version 8.5
- 2003: version 8.1

== See also ==
- Comparison of nucleic acid simulation software
- Comparison of force field implementations
- List of software for molecular mechanics modeling
- List of software for Monte Carlo molecular modeling
- List of protein structure prediction software
- Molecular design software
- Molecular modelling
- Molecule editor
- Abalone (molecular mechanics)
- Ascalaph Designer
- CHARMM
- GROMACS
- MDynaMix
- NAMD
- Tinker (software)
