= Comparison of nucleic acid simulation software =

This is a list of notable computer programs that are used for nucleic acids simulations.

- Min – Optimization
- MD – Molecular dynamics
- MC – Monte Carlo
- REM – Replica exchange method
- Crt – Cartesian coordinates
- Int – Internal coordinates
- Exp – Explicit water
- Imp – Implicit water
- Lig – Ligand interactions
- GPU – Hardware accelerated

Name	View 3D	Model build	Min	MD	MC	REM	Crt	Int	Exp	Imp	Lig	GPU	Comments	License	Website
Abalone	Yes	Yes	Yes	Yes	Yes	Yes	Yes	No	Yes	Yes	Yes	Yes	DNA, proteins, ligands	Free	Agile Molecule
AMBER	No	Yes	Yes	Yes	No	Yes	Yes	No	Yes	Yes	Yes	Yes	AMBER force field	Proprietary	ambermd.org
Ascalaph Designer	Yes	Yes	Yes	Yes	No	No	Yes	No	Yes	Yes	Yes	No	AMBER	Free, GPL	biomolecular-modeling.com
CHARMM	No	Yes	Yes	Yes	Yes	No	Yes	No	Yes	Yes	Yes	No	CHARMM force field	Proprietary	charmm.org
CP2K	No	No	Yes	Yes	Yes	Yes	Yes	No	Yes	No	No	Yes		Free, GPL	cp2k.org
Forecaster (Fitted)	Yes	No	Yes	No	No	No	Yes	No	Yes	No	Yes	No	Small molecule docking to nucleic acids with water placement	Free for academia, Proprietary	Molecular Forecaster
ICM	Yes	Yes	Yes	No	Yes	No	No	Yes	No	Yes	No	No	Global optimization	Proprietary	Molsoft
JUMNA	No	Yes	Yes	No	No	No	No	Yes	No	Yes	No	No		Proprietary	
MDynaMix	Yes	Yes	No	Yes	No	No	Yes	No	Yes	No	Yes	No	Common MD	Free, GPL	Stockholm University
Molecular Operating Environment (MOE)	Yes	Yes	Yes	Yes	No	No	Yes	No	Yes	No	Yes	No		Proprietary	Chemical Computing Group
Nucleic Acid Builder (NAB)	No	Yes	No	No	No	No	No	No	No	No	No	No	Generates models for unusual DNA, RNA	Free, GPL	New Jersey University
NAnoscale Molecular Dynamics (NAMD)	Yes	No	Yes	Yes	No	No	Yes	No	Yes	No	Yes	Yes	Fast, parallel MD, CUDA	Free	University of Illinois
oxDNA	Yes	Yes	Yes	Yes	Yes	Yes	Yes	No	No	Yes	No	Yes	Coarse-grained models of DNA, RNA	Free, GPL	dna.physics.ox.ac.uk LAMMPS CG-DNA
QRNAS	No	No	Yes	No	No	No	Yes	No	No	Yes	No	No	High resolution refinement of models of RNA, DNA and hybrids using AMBER force field .	Free, GPL	Genesilico Github
SimRNA	Yes	Yes	No	No	Yes	Yes	Yes	Yes	No	Yes	No	No	Coarse grained modeling of RNA	Free for Academic, Proprietary	Genesilico
SimRNAweb	Yes	Yes	No	No	Yes	Yes	Yes	Yes	No	Yes	No	No	Coarse grained modeling of RNA	Free	Genesilico
YASARA	Yes	Yes	Yes	Yes	No	No	Yes	No	Yes	No	Yes	No	Interactive simulations	Proprietary	www.YASARA.org

== See also ==
- Nucleic acid structure prediction
- Molecular Modelling
- Molecular modeling on GPUs
- Molecular graphics
- Molecular mechanics
- Molecular dynamics
- Molecular design software
- Molecule editor
- Quantum chemistry computer programs
- List of molecular graphics systems
- List of protein structure prediction software
- List of sequence alignment software
- List of gene prediction software
- List of RNA structure prediction software
- Comparison of software for molecular mechanics modeling
- List of software for Monte Carlo molecular modeling
- List of software for nanostructures modeling
- Force field
- Comparison of force field implementations
