= Q (software) =

Molecular dynamics simulation software

- Original author(s): Johan Åqvist, John Marelius, Paul Bauer, Lynn Kamerlin
- Developer(s): The Q development team at Uppsala University, Sweden; Uppsala Molekylmekaniska HB
- Initial release: 1999; 26 years ago
- Stable release: 6.0 / 2017; 8 years ago
- Repository: github.com/esguerra/Q6
- Written in: Fortran
- Operating system: Linux, macOS, Windows by Cygwin, any other Unix variety
- Platform: x86, x86-64
- Available in: English
- Type: Molecular dynamics simulation
- License: open source GNU General Public License version 2 (GPLv2)
- Website: github.com/qusers/Q6

Q is a computer software package for molecular dynamics (MD) simulation (current release: Q6). Unlike other MD codes, it has specialized since its conception (Marelius et al. 1998) on three specific types of free energy calculations. These calculations are based on the methods: empirical valence bond (EVB), free energy perturbation (FEP), and linear interaction energy (LIE), as well as, more recently, also path integral calculations using the bisection quantum classical path (BQCP) approach.

The methods in which the program specializes can return quantitative calculations of the energy balance which occurs in proteins and nucleic acids. It can provide insight into key problems in biochemistry such as, energetic details on parts of the translation mechanism in mitochondrial ribosomes (Lind et al. 2013), or details in enzymatic reactions (Mones et al. 2013), among others.

The program is similar to GROMACS in being force-field agnostic, meaning that it provides no force-field, but can rather use common force-fields such as CHARMM, AMBER, OPLS, and GROMOS.

The software provides one main utility for molecular dynamics called qdyn, and various subprograms such as qprep (to prepare input files from X-ray coordinates), qfep (to process MD calculations for FEP), and others.

== General command to run ==
The general command to run Q is very similar to that of other MD programs and its syntax for a dynamics run is as follows:

qdyn inputfile.inp > outputfile.out

qdyn – This is the name of the main program which runs dynamics.

inputfile.inp – This is a text file which specifies all options to the program such as how long are the simulation and the time-steps, what temperature is being simulated, and many others.

outputfile.out – This is the output file which gives a detailed account of the energetic results. The verbosity of the information in the output file is controlled in the input file. The output places emphasis on reporting on nonbonded interactions such as van der Waals force and electrostatics interactions in detail on the solvent, the solution, and the interactions among them.

== See also ==
- OPLS
- GROMOS
- CHARMM
- NAMD
- Yasara
- Comparison of force field implementations
- Free energy perturbation
- Comparison of software for molecular mechanics modeling
- Molecular design software
- OpenMM
