= BOSS (molecular mechanics) =

Biochemical and Organic Simulation System
- Original author(s): William L. Jorgensen
- Developer(s): Jorgensen Research Group, Yale University
- Initial release: 1987; 38 years ago
- Stable release: 4.9 / January 2013; 12 years ago
- Written in: Fortran
- Operating system: Unix, Linux, Windows
- Platform: x86, x86-64
- Available in: English
- Type: Molecular modelling
- License: Proprietary
- Website: zarbi.chem.yale.edu/software.html

Biochemical and Organic Simulation System (BOSS) is a general-purpose molecular modeling program that performs molecular mechanics calculations, Metropolis Monte Carlo statistical mechanics simulations, and semiempirical Austin Model 1 (AM1), PM3, and PDDG/PM3 quantum mechanics calculations. The molecular mechanics calculations cover energy minimizations, normal mode analysis and conformational searching with the Optimized Potentials for Liquid Simulations (OPLS) force fields. BOSS is developed by Prof. William L. Jorgensen at Yale University, and distributed commercially by Cemcomco, LLC and Schrödinger, Inc.

== Key features ==
- OPLS force field inventor
- Geometry optimization
- Semiempirical quantum chemistry
- MC simulations for pure liquids, solutions, clusters or gas-phase systems
- Free energies are computed from statistical perturbation (free energy perturbation (FEP)) theory
- TIP3P, TIP4P, and TIP5P water models

== See also ==
- Molecular modelling
- Molecular graphics
- Molecule editor
- Molecular design software
- List of software for Monte Carlo molecular modeling
- List of molecular graphics systems
- Comparison of software for molecular mechanics modeling
- Abalone (molecular mechanics)
- AMBER
- Ascalaph Designer
- CHARMM
- GROMACS
- MDynaMix
- NAMD
- Tinker (software)
