= Molecular modeling on GPUs =

Using graphics processing units for molecular simulations

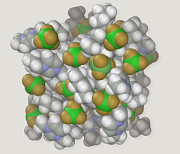
Ionic liquid simulation on GPU (Abalone)

Molecular modeling on GPU is the technique of using a graphics processing unit (GPU) for molecular simulations.

In 2007, Nvidia introduced video cards that could be used not only to show graphics but also for scientific calculations. These cards include many arithmetic units (as of 2022, up to 18,176 in the RTX 6000 Ada) working in parallel. Long before this event, the computational power of video cards was purely used to accelerate graphics calculations. The new features of these cards made it possible to develop parallel programs in a high-level application programming interface (API) named CUDA. This technology substantially simplified programming by enabling programs to be written in C/C++. More recently, OpenCL allows cross-platform GPU acceleration.

Quantum chemistry calculations and molecular mechanics simulations (molecular modeling in terms of classical mechanics) are among beneficial applications of this technology. The video cards can accelerate the calculations tens of times, so a PC with such a card has the power similar to that of a cluster of workstations based on common processors.

== GPU accelerated molecular modelling software ==
=== Programs ===
- Abalone – Molecular Dynamics (Benchmark)
- ACEMD on GPUs since 2009 Benchmark
- AMBER on GPUs version
- Ascalaph on GPUs version – Ascalaph Liquid GPU
- AutoDock – Molecular docking
- BigDFT Ab initio program based on wavelet
- BrianQC Quantum chemistry (HF and DFT) and molecular mechanics
- Blaze ligand-based virtual screening
- CHARMM – Molecular dynamics
- CP2K Ab initio molecular dynamics
- Desmond (software) on GPUs, workstations, and clusters
- EXESS – Quantum chemistry and ab initio Molecular Dynamics
- Firefly (formerly PC GAMESS)
- FastROCS
- GOMC – GPU Optimized Monte Carlo simulation engine
- GPIUTMD – Graphical processors for Many-Particle Dynamics
- GPU4PySCF – GPU accelerated plugin package for PySCF
- GPUMD - A lightweight general-purpose molecular dynamics code
- GROMACS on GPUs
- HALMD – Highly Accelerated Large-scale MD package
- HOOMD-blue – Highly Optimized Object-oriented Many-particle Dynamics—Blue Edition
- LAMMPS on GPUs version – lammps for accelerators
- LIO DFT-Based GPU optimized code -
- Octopus has support for OpenCL.
- oxDNA – DNA and RNA coarse-grained simulations on GPUs
- PWmat – Plane-Wave Density Functional Theory simulations
- RUMD - Roskilde University Molecular Dynamics
- TeraChem – Quantum chemistry and ab initio Molecular Dynamics
- TINKER on GPUs.
- VMD & NAMD on GPUs versions
- YASARA runs MD simulations on all GPUs using OpenCL.

=== API ===
- BrianQC – has an open C level API for quantum chemistry simulations on GPUs, provides GPU-accelerated version of Q-Chem and PSI
- OpenMM – an API for accelerating molecular dynamics on GPUs, v1.0 provides GPU-accelerated version of GROMACS
- mdcore – an open-source platform-independent library for molecular dynamics simulations on modern shared-memory parallel architectures.

=== Distributed computing projects ===
- GPUGRID distributed supercomputing infrastructure
- Folding@home distributed computing project
- Exscalate4Cov large-scale virtual screening experiment

== See also ==
- Comparison of nucleic acid simulation software
- Comparison of software for molecular mechanics modeling
- Folding@home
- GPU
- GPU cluster
- GPGPU
- List of molecular graphics systems
- List of quantum chemistry and solid state physics software
- Molecular design software
- Molecule editor
- Simulated reality
