= Comparison of force-field implementations =

This is a table of notable computer programs implementing molecular mechanics force fields.

Program	OPLS	AMBER	CHARMM	GAFF	MMFF	QVBMM	UFF	Comments
Abalone	UA	94, 96, 99SB, 03, GS, ii, Automatic FF generator	No	No	No	No	UFF-Dreiding-like field	For proteins, DNA, ligands
AMBER	Yes	Yes	Via chamber tool since v11	Yes	No	No	No	
Ascalaph Designer	UA	94, 99SB, 03	No	No	No	No	No	
Avogadro	No	No	No	Yes	94, 94s	No	Yes	
Balloon	No	No	No	No	94	No	No	MMFF94-like
BOSS	Yes	No	No	No	No	No	No	
CHARMM	Yes*	Yes*	Yes*	Via CHARMM-GUI	Full MMFF94, but code rumored unmaintained	No	No	* in standard distribution
Gabedit	No	Yes	No	Yes	Yes	No	No	
Gaussian mm utility	No	Yes	No	No	No	No	Yes	Dreiding field available
GROMACS	Yes	Yes*	Yes*	Yes	No	No	No	* in standard distribution since v4.5.0
MOE	AA	89, 94, 99, also with Extended Hückel Theory	22, 27	No	94(s)	No	No	
NAMD	Yes	Yes	Yes	Yes	No	No	No	
Openbabel	No	Yes	No	Yes	94, 94s	No	Yes	
Q	Yes	Yes	Yes	No	No	No	No	For biopolymers
Tinker	UA, AA, AA/L	94, 96, 98, 99	19, 27	No	94	No	No	For proteins, organic molecules
Yasara	No	94, 96, 99, 03	No	No	No	No	No	Plus custom fields for hires refinement

== See also ==
- Force field (chemistry)
- List of software for Monte Carlo molecular modeling
- Molecular mechanics
- Molecular design software
- Molecule editor
- Comparison of software for molecular mechanics modeling
- Molecular modeling on GPU
