= Discovery Studio =

Discovery Studio is a suite of software for simulating small molecule and macromolecule systems. It is developed and distributed by Dassault Systèmes BIOVIA (formerly Accelrys).

The product suite has a strong academic collaboration programme, supporting scientific research and makes use of a number of software algorithms developed originally in the scientific community, including Chemistry at Harvard Macromolecular Mechanics (CHARMM), MODELLER, DelPhi, ZDOCK, DMol3, and more.

== Scope ==
Discovery Studio provides software applications covering the following areas:

- Simulations
  - Including molecular mechanics, molecular dynamics, quantum mechanics
  - For molecular mechanics based simulations: Include implicit and explicit-based solvent models and membrane models
  - Also includes the ability to perform hybrid quantum mechanics/molecular mechanics (QM/MM) calculations
- Ligand design
  - Including tools for enumerating molecular libraries and library optimization
- Pharmacophore modeling
  - Including creation, validation and virtual screening
- Structure-based design
  - Including tools for fragment-based placement and refinement, receptor-ligand docking and pose refinement, de novo design
- Macromolecule design and validation
- Macromolecule engineering
  - Specialist tools for protein-protein docking
  - Specialist tools for Antibody design and optimization
  - Specialist tools for membrane-bound proteins, including GPCRs
- QSAR
  - Covering methods such as multiple linear regression, partial least squares, recursive partitioning, Genetic Function approximation and 3D field-based QSAR
- ADME
- Predictive toxicity

== See also ==
- List of software for molecular mechanics modeling
- Quantum chemistry computer programs
- Molecular modelling
- Molecular design software
- Protein homology modelling
- MDL Chime
