= OpenMM =

Molecular dynamics software

- Original author: Peter Eastman
- Developers: Stanford University; Memorial Sloan Kettering Cancer Center; Pompeu Fabra University; National Heart, Lung, and Blood Institute
- Initial release: January 20, 2010; 15 years ago
- Stable release: 8.2.0 / 8 November 2024; 13 months ago
- Repository: github.com/openmm/openmm
- Written in: C++, C, CUDA, Python
- Operating system: Linux, macOS, Windows
- Platform: Many
- Available in: English
- Type: Molecular dynamics
- License: MIT License; LGPL
- Website: openmm.org

OpenMM is a library for performing molecular dynamics simulations on a wide variety of hardware architectures. First released in January 2010, it was written by Peter Eastman at the Vijay S. Pande lab at Stanford University. It is notable for its implementation in the Folding@home project's core22 kernel. Core22, also developed at the Pande lab, uses OpenMM to perform protein dynamics simulations on GPUs via CUDA and OpenCL. During the COVID-19 pandemic, a peak of 280,000 GPUs were estimated to be running OpenMM via core22.

== Features ==
OpenMM has a C++ API as well as a Python wrapper. Developers are able to customize force fields as well as integrators for low-level simulation control. Users who only require high-level control of their simulations can use built-in force fields (consisting of many commonly used force fields) and built in integrators like Langevin, Verlet, Nosé–Hoover, and Brownian.

== See also ==
- GROMACS
- CHARMM
- NAMD
- AMBER
- Comparison of force field implementations
- Grace (plotting tool)
- Folding@home
- Comparison of software for molecular mechanics modeling
- Molecular design software
- Bennett acceptance ratio
- LAMMPS
