= X-PLOR =

X-PLOR is a computer software package for computational structural biology originally developed by Axel T. Brunger at Yale University. It was first published in 1987 as an offshoot of CHARMM - a similar program that ran on supercomputers made by Cray Inc. It is used in the fields of X-ray crystallography and nuclear magnetic resonance spectroscopy of proteins (NMR) analysis.

X-PLOR is a highly sophisticated program that provides an interface between theoretical foundations and experimental data in structural biology, with specific emphasis on X-ray crystallography and nuclear magnetic resonance spectroscopy in solution of biological macro-molecules. It is intended mainly for researchers and students in the fields of computational chemistry, structural biology, and computational molecular biology.

== See also ==
- Comparison of software for molecular mechanics modeling
- Molecular mechanics
