= Protein Local Optimization Program =

- Original authors: Matthew P. Jacobson, Richard A. Friesner
- Developers: University of California, San Francisco, Schrödinger
- Initial release: 2000; 26 years ago
- Stable release: Schrödinger Release 2016-4 / April 2016; 9 years ago
- Written in: Fortran
- Operating system: Unix-like
- Available in: English
- Type: Molecular mechanics
- License: Proprietary commercial, academic freeware
- Website: wiki.jacobsonlab.org

Protein Local Optimization Program (PLOP) is computer software, a molecular dynamics simulation package written in the programming language Fortran. It was developed originally by Matthew P. Jacobson and Richard A. Friesner of the Friesner lab at Columbia University, and then moved to the Jacobson lab at University of California, San Francisco (UCSF), and Schrödinger, LLC.

== See also ==
- Comparison of software for molecular mechanics modeling
