= MMFF =

MMFF may refer to:

- Merck Molecular Force Field
- Metro Manila Film Festival
