= GROMOS =

Software in molecular physics

- Developers: Wilfred van Gunsteren. Philippe Hünenberger, Sereina Riniker, Chris Oostenbrink, Niels Hansen
- Release: 1978; 48 years ago
- Stable release: GROMOS 11 version 1.6.1 / April 15, 2024; 2 years ago
- Written in: Fortran <= 1996, C++ => 2011
- Operating system: Unix-like
- Platform: x86
- Available in: English
- Type: Molecular dynamics
- License: GNU General Public License version 2
- Website: www.gromos.net

GROningen MOlecular Simulation (GROMOS) is the name of a force field for molecular dynamics simulation, and a related computer software package, which has been developed until 1990 at the University of Groningen, and at the Computer-Aided Chemistry Group at the Laboratory for Physical Chemistry at the Swiss Federal Institute of Technology (ETH Zurich). At Groningen, Herman Berendsen was involved in its development. The development is currently a collaborative effort between the research group of Wilfred van Gunsteren, the research groups of Philippe Hünenberger and Sereina Riniker at ETH Zurich, Chris Oostenbrink at BOKU University in Vienna, Austria, and Niels Hansen at the University of Stuttgart in Stuttgart, Germany.

The united atom force field was optimized with respect to the condensed phase properties of alkanes, polar molecules and charged molecules.

== Versions ==
=== GROMOS87 ===
Aliphatic and aromatic hydrogen atoms were included implicitly by representing the carbon atom and attached hydrogen atoms as one group centered on the carbon atom, a united atom force field. The van der Waals force parameters were derived from calculations of the crystal structures of hydrocarbons, and on amino acids using short (0.8 nm) nonbonded cutoff radii.

=== GROMOS96 ===
In 1996, a substantial rewrite of the software package was released. The force field was also improved, e.g., in the following way: aliphatic CH_{n} groups were represented as united atoms with van der Waals interactions reparametrized on the basis of a series of molecular dynamics simulations of model liquid alkanes using long (1.4 nm) nonbonded cutoff radii. This version is continually being refined and several different parameter sets are available. GROMOS96 includes studies of molecular dynamics, stochastic dynamics, and energy minimization. The energy component was also part of the prior GROMOS, named GROMOS87. GROMOS96 was planned and conceived during a time of 20 months. The package is made of 40 different programs, each with a different essential function. An example of two important programs within the GROMOS96 are PROGMT, in charge of constructing molecular topology and also PROPMT, changing the classical molecular topology into the path-integral molecular topology.

=== GROMOS05 ===
An updated version of the software package was introduced in 2005.

=== GROMOS11 version 1.6.1 ===
The current GROMOS version was released in November 2023 and updated in April 2024. Since the release of GROMOS11, the package consists of two subpackages: gromos++ and md++. The gromos++ package consists of a large number of smaller programs, which can be helpful to setup and analyse molecular simulations. The md++ package contains the actual MD engines, which can perform energy minimisations, stochastic dynamic simulations and molecular dynamics simulations. These can incorporate (alchemical) free energy calculations or enhanced sampling methods.

New functionalities of the 1.6.1 release include support for virtual atoms with non-bonded interactions, shifted reaction-field, buffer region neural network, combined TI with (A-)EDS and selective Gaussian accelerated MD.

== Parameter sets ==
Some of the force field parameter sets that are based on the GROMOS force field. The A-version applies to condensed phase solutions of proteins, nucleotides, and sugars. The B-version applies to isolated molecules (gas phase). Additionally, some specialized parameter subsets have been derived from the main parameter sets, for example 54A8_beta for beta-amino acids, 54A8_cof for cofactors and other molecules, 54A8_bb for protein backbones and 54A8_glyc for glycans.

=== 54 ===
- 54A8 - recalibration of the nonbonded interaction parameters for the charged amino-acid side chains, based on ionic side chain analogs.
- 54A7 - 53A6 taken and adjusted torsional angle terms to better reproduce helical propensities, altered N–H, C=O repulsion, new CH_{3} charge group, parameterisation of Na^{+} and Cl^{−} to improve free energy of hydration and new improper dihedrals.
- 54B7 - 53B6 in vacuo taken and changed in same manner as 53A6 to 54A7.

=== 53 ===
- 53A5 - optimised by first fitting to reproduce the thermodynamic properties of pure liquids of a range of small polar molecules and the solvation free enthalpies of amino acid analogs in cyclohexane, is an expansion and renumbering of 45A3.
- 53A6 - 53A5 taken and adjusted partial charges to reproduce hydration free enthalpies in water, recommended for simulations of biomolecules in explicit water.

=== 45 ===
- 45A3 - suitable to apply to lipid aggregates such as membranes and micelles, for mixed systems of aliphatics with or without water, for polymers, and other apolar systems that may interact with different biomolecules.
- 45A4 - 45A3 reparameterised to improve DNA representation.

=== 43 ===
- 43A1
- 43A2

== See also ==
- GROMOS
- Ascalaph Designer
- Comparison of software for molecular mechanics modeling
- Comparison of force field implementations
