= MDynaMix =

Software for modelling molecules

Molecular Dynamics of Mixtures
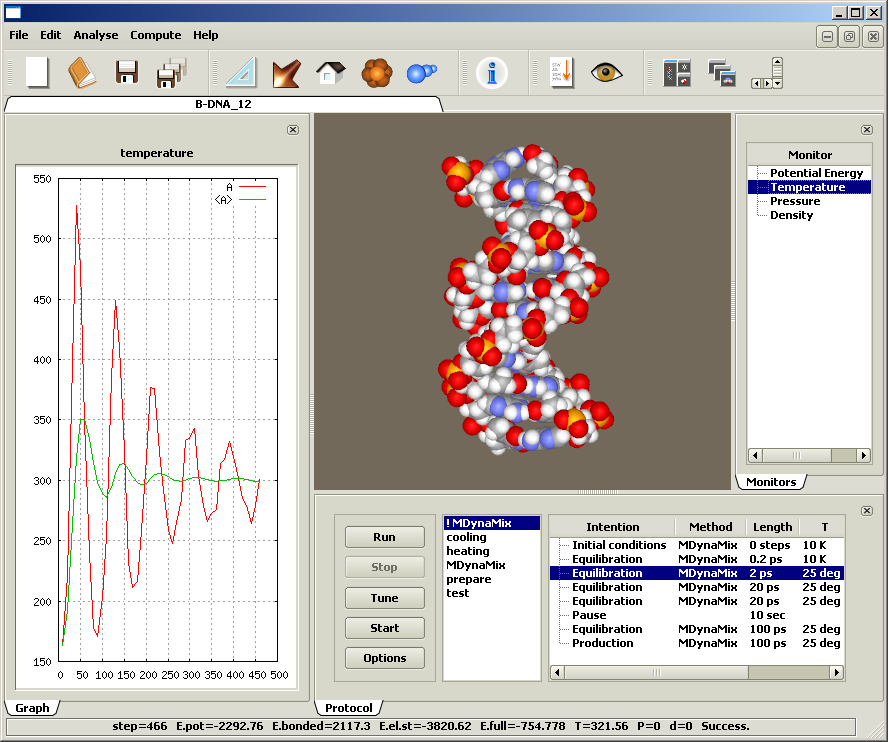
- DNA simulation on MDynaMix
- Original authors: Aatto Laaksonen, Alexander Lyubartsev
- Developers: Stockholm University, Department of Materials and Environmental Chemistry, Division of Physical Chemistry
- Initial release: 1993; 32 years ago
- Stable release: 5.3.0 / 15 January 2019; 6 years ago
- Written in: Fortran 77-90
- Operating system: Unix, Unix-like, Linux, Windows
- Platform: x86, x86-64, Cray
- Available in: English
- Type: Molecular dynamics
- License: GPL
- Website: www.fos.su.se/~sasha/mdynamix

Molecular Dynamics of Mixtures (MDynaMix) is a computer software package for general purpose molecular dynamics to simulate mixtures of molecules, interacting by AMBER- and CHARMM-like force fields in periodic boundary conditions. Algorithms are included for NVE, NVT, NPT, anisotropic NPT ensembles, and Ewald summation to treat electrostatic interactions. The code was written in a mix of Fortran 77 and 90 (with Message Passing Interface (MPI) for parallel execution). The package runs on Unix and Unix-like (Linux) workstations, clusters of workstations, and on Windows in sequential mode.

MDynaMix is developed at the Division of Physical Chemistry, Department of Materials and Environmental Chemistry, Stockholm University, Sweden. It is released as open-source software under a GNU General Public License (GPL).

== Programs ==
- md is the main MDynaMix block
- makemol is a utility which provides help to create files describing molecular structure and the force field
- tranal is a suite of utilities to analyze trajectories
- mdee is a version of the program which implements expanded ensemble method to compute free energy and chemical potential (is not parallelized)
- mge provides a graphical user interface to construct molecular models and monitor dynamics process

== Field of application ==
- Thermodynamic properties of liquids
- Nucleic acid - ions interaction
- Modeling of lipid bilayers
- Polyelectrolytes
- Ionic liquids
- X-ray spectra of liquid water
- Force Field development

== See also ==
- Abalone (molecular mechanics)
- AMBER
- Ascalaph Designer
- BOSS (molecular mechanics)
- CHARMM
- GROMACS
- MacroModel
- Molecule editor
- Molecular modelling
- Molecular design software
- NAMD
- Tinker (software)
- Comparison of software for molecular mechanics modeling
