= MDL Chime =

Plugin used by web browsers to display the 3D structure of molecules

- Original author: Elsevier
- Developer: Symyx Technologies
- Initial release: 1996 (0.9 Beta); 1997 (1.0 Full release)
- Stable release: 2.6 SP7 / July 31, 2007; 18 years ago
- Operating system: Classic Mac OS, Microsoft Windows
- Platform: Internet Explorer, Mozilla Firefox
- Website: http://accelrys.com/products/collaborative-science/biovia-discovery-studio/

MDL Chime was a free plugin used by web browsers to display the three-dimensional structures of molecules. and was based on the RasMol code.

== Plug-in ==
Chime was used by a wide range of biochemistry web sites for the visualization of macromolecules, many of which were linked to the World Index of Molecular Visualization Resources MolVisIndex.Org. Chime was also used until 2006 at the Protein Data Bank (PDB) to examine structures stored there.

Although available in 1996 in both Windows 95 and classic Mac OS versions for both Netscape and Internet Explorer browsers, development of Chime did not follow the move to Mac OS X for the Mac and support for Windows-based browsers other than Internet Explorer was limited (although it works well in Mozilla Firefox). One significant feature added in 1997 was the ability to display spectroscopic data in the form of the IUPAC JCAMP-DX protocols. Apart from this, most subsequent updates were for the installation package to follow the development of Windows and Internet Explorer. Accelrys announced in 2012 that Chime was no longer supported and would remain available for download until the end of 2012. Chime was part of the ISIS product line acquired by Symyx Technologies from scientific publisher Elsevier in October 2007. Now Chime is owned by Dassault Systèmes BIOVIA (formerly Accelrys), and has been merged into Discovery Studio, but no longer exists as a free browser plugin.

Chime largely has been superseded by Jmol, a non-proprietary open-source Java molecular visualization application and JavaScript applet that has maintained most Chime command compatibility while adding numerous features.

== See also ==
- List of molecular graphics systems
- ISIS/Draw
- Molecular graphics
- Discovery Studio
