= Peter Kollman =

American chemist

Peter Andrew Kollman
- Born: July 24, 1944; Iowa City, Iowa
- Died: May 25, 2001 (aged 56); San Francisco, California
- Education: Grinnell College; Princeton University
- Scientific career
- Fields: Chemistry
- Workplaces: University of California, San Francisco
- Thesis: A Theory of Anomalous Water: A cyclic, symmetrically bonded form of water and related species have a stability comparable to their liquids. (1970)
- Doctoral advisor: Leland C. Allen

Peter Andrew Kollman (July 24, 1944–May 25, 2001) was a professor of chemistry and pharmaceutical chemistry at the University of California, San Francisco.

He is known for his work in computational chemistry, molecular modeling and bioinformatics, especially for his role in the development of the AMBER force field and molecular dynamics software package.

== Biography ==
Kollman obtained his B.A. from Grinnell College in 1966 and his M.A. and Ph.D. from Princeton University in 1967 and 1970 respectively. His PhD supervisor was Leland C. Allen, who had received his PhD in 1956 from MIT supervised by John C. Slater. After a post-doctoral position at the University of Cambridge with David Buckingham, Kollman was hired as an assistant professor by UCSF, where he spent the rest of his career.

In 1995, he was distinguished with the Computers in Chemistry Award from the American Chemical Society.

In 2000, Kollman authored a seminal review in Accounts of Chemical Research introducing the Molecular Mechanics Poisson–Boltzmann Surface Area (MM-PBSA) method as a general framework for calculating free energies of biomolecular systems. This approach combined explicit-solvent molecular dynamics trajectories with continuum electrostatics, allowing solvation and binding free energies to be computed with greater efficiency and physical rigor than was previously possible. The review articulated MM-PBSA as the defining advance of what Kollman termed the "fourth era" of computational chemistry, following the establishment of stable explicit-solvent simulations in the "third era". MM-PBSA proved widely applicable, spanning protein folding, nucleic acid stability, protein–protein and protein–RNA recognition, and ligand binding.

In 1998, Kollman's group reported the first microsecond-scale molecular dynamics simulation of a protein, the villin headpiece subdomain. This was the longest biomolecular simulation ever reported at the time and MM-PBSA energetic analysis of the trajectory compared to that of the crystal structure suggested a folding half-life of approximately 1 μs and a total folding time of ~4.2 μs, the first physics-based prediction of a protein folding time. This prediction was later corroborated experimentally by laser temperature-jump (T-jump) kinetics, which measured villin folding of 4.3 μs. The work provided an atomistic view of folding dynamics and established a benchmark for long-timescale MD simulations.

Following the results of the CASP3 protein structure prediction experiment, Kollman collaborated with David Baker's group to apply MD and MM-PBSA energetic analysis to Rosetta-generated models, using these physics-based methods to evaluate and refine candidate structures. Together they showed that MD could refine some Rosetta-generated models and that MM-PBSA could discriminate near-native structures by predicted free energy, providing a physics-based filter in the "endgame" of structure prediction. These findings motivated subsequent versions of Rosetta to incorporate increasingly detailed physics-based energy terms, including explicit Coulombic electrostatics, Lennard-Jones potentials for van der Waals interactions, and implicit solvation.

The legacy of Kollman's AMBER force field extends further into modern structure prediction methods. AlphaFold—recognized alongside Rosetta with a share of the 2024 Nobel Prize in Chemistry for breakthroughs in protein structure prediction—applied deep learning and multiple sequence alignments to advance comparative modeling, while Rosetta pioneered de novo prediction and protein design. In AlphaFold's workflow, an AMBER-based relaxation step is used to correct local geometry, resolve steric clashes, and improve physical plausibility. This integration of physics-based energy terms into Rosetta's assembly and scoring, and into AlphaFold's refinement pipeline, underscores how Kollman's contributions continue to shape the forefront of computational structural biology.

He was awarded the UCSF medal in 2018.
