= List of software for Monte Carlo molecular modeling =

This is a list of computer programs that use Monte Carlo methods for molecular modeling.

Software	License	Code language(s)	GPU support	Website
Abalone	Proprietary	Not publicly documented	Yes, CUDA	biomolecular-modeling.com/Abalone
BOSS	Free for academic use	Fortran	Not documented	traken.chem.yale.edu
CASINO	Custom academic-use license	Fortran 2008, C	Yes, OpenACC	vallico.net/casinoqmc
Cassandra	GPL-3.0	Fortran; Python utilities	Not documented; OpenMP CPU parallelism	cassandra.nd.edu
CP2K	GPL-2.0-or-later	Fortran 2008, C, C++	Yes, CUDA, HIP/ROCm, OpenCL	cp2k.org
FEASST	Public domain in the United States	C++14; Python	Not documented	pages.nist.gov/feasst
GOMC	MIT License	C++, CUDA	Yes, NVIDIA CUDA	gomc-wsu.org
ICM	Proprietary	Not publicly documented; ICM scripting language	Module-dependent	molsoft.com
MacroModel	Proprietary	Not publicly documented	Not documented	schrodinger.com/macromodel
Materials Studio	Proprietary	Not publicly documented	Module-dependent	3ds.com/biovia/materials-studio
ms2	CC BY-NC 3.0	Fortran 95	Not documented; MPI/OpenMP CPU parallelism	ms-2.de
PyQMC	MIT License	Python	Yes	pyqmc.readthedocs.io
RASPA	MIT License	C++23; Python bindings	Partial	iraspa.org
QMC=Chem	GPL-3.0	Fortran	Not documented	trex-coe.eu/QMC=Chem
QMCPACK	University of Illinois/NCSA Open Source License	C++	Yes, CUDA, HIP, SYCL, OpenMP offload	qmcpack.org
QMeCha	CC BY-NC-ND	Fortran	Not documented	—
QWalk	GPL-2.0	C++	Not documented	qwalk.org
Spartan	Proprietary	C, C++, Fortran	Not documented	wavefun.com/spartan
Tinker	Custom Tinker license	Fortran; GPU implementations use C++/CUDA	Yes	tinkertools.org
TransRot	Custom non-commercial license	Java	Not documented	engfac.cooper.edu/topper
Towhee	GPL-2.0	Fortran, C	Not documented	towhee.sourceforge.net
TurboRVB	GPL-3.0-or-later	Fortran, C	Yes, OpenMP offload / CUDA	turborvb.sissa.it

== See also ==
- List of computational physics software
- List of quantum chemistry and solid state physics software
- Comparison of software for molecular mechanics modeling
- Comparison of nucleic acid simulation software
- Molecular design software
- Molecule editor
- www.molsoft.com
