= Comparison of software for molecular mechanics modeling =

This is a list of computer programs that are predominantly used for molecular mechanics calculations.

- GPU – GPU accelerated
- I – Has interface
- Imp – Implicit water
- MC – Monte Carlo
- MD – Molecular dynamics
- Min – Optimization
- QM – Quantum mechanics
- REM – Replica exchange method

Name	View 3D	Model builder	Min	MD	MC	REM	QM	Imp	GPU	Comments	License	Website
AMBER	No	Yes	Yes	Yes	Yes	Yes	I	Yes	Yes	High Performance MD, Comprehensive analysis tools	Proprietary, Free open source	AMBER MD
Abalone	Yes	Yes	Yes	Yes	Yes	Yes	I	Yes	Yes	Biomolecular simulations, protein folding.	Proprietary, gratis, commercial	Agile Molecule
ADF	Yes	Yes	Yes	Yes	Yes	No	Yes	Yes	Yes	Modeling suite: ReaxFF, UFF, QM-MM with Amber and Tripos force fields, DFT and semi-empirical methods, conformational analysis with RDKit; partly GPU-accelerated	Proprietary, commercial, gratis trial	SCM
Ascalaph Designer	Yes	Yes	Yes	Yes	Yes	Yes	I	Yes	Yes	Molecular building (DNA, proteins, hydrocarbons, nanotubes), molecular dynamics, GPU acceleration	Mixed: free open source (GNU GPL) & commercial	Ascalaph Project
Avogadro	Yes	Yes	Yes	No	No	No	I	No	No	Molecule building, editing (peptides, small molecules, crystals), conformational analysis, 2D/3D conversion; extensible interfaces to other tools	Free open source GNU GPL	Avogadro
BOSS	No	No	Yes	No	Yes	No	Yes	No	No	OPLS	Proprietary	Yale University
CHARMM	No	Yes	Yes	Yes	Yes	I	I	Yes	Yes	Commercial version with multiple graphical front ends is sold by BIOVIA (as CHARMm), formerly Accelrys.	Proprietary, commercial	charmm.org
CHEMKIN	No	No	No	No	No	No	No	No	No	Chemical reaction kinetics.	Proprietary	CHEMKIN
CP2K	No	No	Yes	Yes	Yes	No	Yes	Yes	Yes	CP2K can perform atomistic and molecular simulations of solid state, liquid and biological systems.	Free open source GNU GPLv2 or later	CP2K
Desmond	Yes	Yes	Yes	Yes	No	Yes	No	No	Yes	High performance MD; has comprehensive GUI to build, visualize, and review results and calculation setup up and launch	Proprietary, commercial or gratis	D. E. Shaw Research Schrödinger
Discovery Studio	Yes	Yes	Yes	Yes	Yes	No	Yes	Yes	Yes	Comprehensive life science modeling and simulation suite of applications focused on optimizing drug discovery process: small molecule simulations, QM-MM, pharmacophore modeling, QSAR, protein-ligand docking, protein homology modeling, sequence analysis, protein-protein docking, antibody modeling, etc.	Proprietary, trial available	Dassault Systèmes BIOVIA (formerly Accelrys)
DL_POLY	Yes	Yes	Yes	Yes	No	No	No	No	No	General-purpose parallel classical molecular dynamics package with energy-minimization methods and a Java GUI for visualization and model preparation.	Free and open-source, LGPLv3	DL_POLY
fold.it	Y / I	Yes	Yes	Yes	Yes	Yes	I	No	No	University of Washington and The Baker Labs; structure prediction, protein folding	Proprietary, commercial or gratis	fold.it download page
FoldX	I	Yes	Yes	No	No	No	No	No	No	Energy calculations, protein design	Proprietary, commercial or gratis	CRG
GROMACS	No	No	Yes	Yes	No	Yes	I	Yes	Yes	High performance MD	Free open source GNU GPL	gromacs.org
GROMOS	No	No	Yes	Yes	Yes	Yes	Yes	Yes	Yes	Intended for biomolecules	Proprietary, commercial	GROMOS website
LAMMPS	Yes	Yes	Yes	Yes	Yes	Yes	I	Yes	Yes	Has potentials for soft and solid-state materials and coarse-grain systems	Free open source, GNU GPLv2	Sandia
MacroModel	Yes	Yes	Yes	Yes	Yes	No	I	Yes	No	OPLS-AA, MMFF, GBSA solvent model, conformational sampling, minimizing, MD. Includes the Maestro GUI which provides visualizing, molecule building, calculation setup, job launch and monitoring, project-level organizing of results, access to a suite of other modelling programs.	Proprietary	Schrödinger
Materials Studio	Yes	Yes	Yes	Yes	Yes	No	Yes	Yes	Yes	Environment that brings materials simulation technology to desktop computing, solving key problems in R&D processes	Proprietary, trial available	Dassault Systèmes BIOVIA (formerly Accelrys)
MBN Explorer + MBN Studio	Yes	Yes	Yes	Yes	Yes	No	No	Yes	Yes	Standard and reactive CHARMM force fields; molecular modeler (carbon nanomaterials, biomolecules, nanocrystals); explicit library of examples	Proprietary, free trial available	MBN Research Center
MDynaMix	No	No	No	Yes	No	No	No	No	No	Parallel MD	Free open source GNU GPL	Stockholm University
MOE	Yes	Yes	Yes	Yes	No	No	I	Yes	No	Molecular Operating Environment (MOE)	Proprietary	Chemical Computing Group
ms2	Yes	Yes	Yes	Yes	Yes	No	No	No	No	direct on the fly computation of large number of thermophysical properties. Main application of ms2 is on fluids.	Free open source	ms-2.de
OpenMM	No	No	Yes	Yes	Yes	Yes	No	Yes	Yes	High Performance MD, highly flexible, Python scriptable	Free open source MIT	OpenMM
Orac	No	Yes	Yes	Yes	No	Yes	No	Yes	No	Molecular dynamics simulation program to explore free energy surfaces in biomolecular systems at the atomic level	Free open source	Orac download page
NAMD + VMD	Yes	Yes	Yes	Yes	No	Yes	I	Yes	Yes	Fast, parallel MD, CUDA	Proprietary, free academic use, source code	Beckman Institute
NWChem	No	No	Yes	Yes	No	No	Yes	No	No	High-performance computational chemistry software, includes quantum mechanics, molecular dynamics and combined QM-MM methods	Free open source, Educational Community License version 2.0	NWChem
Protein Local Optimization Program	No	Yes	Yes	Yes	Yes	No	No	No	No	Helix, loop, and side chain optimizing, fast energy minimizing	Proprietary	PLOP wiki
Q	No	No	No	Yes	No	No	No	No	No	(I) Free energy perturbation (FEP) simulations, (II) empirical valence bond (EVB), calculations of reaction free energies, (III) linear interaction energy (LIE) calculations of receptor-ligand binding affinities	Free open source GNU GPLv2 or later	Q
QuantumATK	Yes	Yes	Yes	Yes	Yes	No	Yes	Yes	Yes	Complete atomistic modeling platform for material science. It includes DFT (Plane-Wave and LCAO), Semi-empirical, and Force Field simulation engines.	Proprietary, commercial	Synopsys QuantumATK
Quantum ESPRESSO	No	No	Yes	Yes	No	No	Yes	I	Yes	Open-source suite focused on electronic-structure calculations and MD (particularly CPMD), popular for its flexibility and extensive community support.	Free open source GNU GPLv2 or later	Quantum ESPRESSO
SAMSON	Yes	Yes	Yes	Yes	No	No	Yes	No	No	Computational nanoscience (life sciences, materials, etc.). Modular architecture, modules termed SAMSON Elements	Proprietary, gratis	SAMSON Connect
Scigress	Yes	Yes	Yes	Yes	No	No	Yes	Yes	No	MM, DFT, semiempirical methods, parallel MD, conformational analysis, Linear scaling SCF, docking protein-ligand, Batch processing, virtual screening, automated builders (molecular dynamics, proteins, crystals)	Proprietary	SCIGRESS.com
Spartan	Yes	Yes	Yes	No	Yes	No	Yes	Yes	No	Small molecule (< 2,000 a.m.u.) MM and QM tools to determine conformation, structure, property, spectra, reactivity, and selectivity.	Proprietary, free trial available	Wavefunction, Inc.
TeraChem	No	No	Yes	Yes	No	No	Yes	No	Yes	High performance GPU-accelerated ab initio molecular dynamics and TD/DFT software package for very large molecular or even nanoscale systems. Runs on NVIDIA GPUs and 64-bit Linux, has heavily optimized CUDA code.	Proprietary, trial licenses available	PetaChem LLC
TINKER	I	Yes	Yes	Yes	Yes	I	I	Yes	Yes	Software tools for molecular design-Tinker-OpenMM Software tools for molecular design-Tinker-HP	Proprietary, gratis	Washington University
UCSF Chimera	Yes	Yes	Yes	No	No	No	No	No	No	Visually appealing viewer, amino acid rotamers and other building, includes Antechamber and MMTK, Ambertools plugins in development.	Proprietary, free academic use	University of California
VASP	No	No	Yes	Yes	No	Yes	Yes	I	Yes	Highly efficient DFT code often used in materials science providing excellent performance on large systems.	Proprietary	VASP
YASARA	Yes	Yes	Yes	Yes	No	No	Yes	No	Yes	Molecular graphics, modeling, simulation	Proprietary	YASARA.org

== See also ==
- Car–Parrinello molecular dynamics
- Comparison of force-field implementations
- Comparison of nucleic acid simulation software
- List of molecular graphics systems
- List of protein structure prediction software
- List of quantum chemistry and solid-state physics software
- List of software for Monte Carlo molecular modeling
- List of software for nanostructures modeling
- Molecular design software
- Molecular dynamics
- Molecular modeling on GPUs
- Molecule editor
- PyMOL
