= Merck molecular force field =

Family of chemistry force fields developed by Merck Research Labs

Merck molecular force field (MMFF) is a family of chemistry force fields developed by Merck Research Laboratories. They are based on the MM3 force field. MMFF is not optimized for one use, such as simulating proteins or small molecules, but tries to perform well for a wide range of organic chemistry calculations. The parameters in the force field have been derived from computational data consisting of approximately 2800 structures spanning a wide range of chemical classes.

The first published force field in the family is MMFF94. A set of molecular structures and the corresponding output of Halgren's MMFF94 implementation is provided at the Computational Chemistry List for validating other MMFF implementations.

One variant of MMFF94 is MMFF94s, which has different out-of-plane bending and dihedral torsion parameters in order to planarize delocalized trigonal nitrogen atoms, e.g. in aniline. The "s" in MMFF94s stands for "static", as MMFF94s better reflects time-averaged geometries than MMFF94.

== See also ==
- Comparison of force-field implementations
