= Abalone (molecular mechanics) =

Molecular graphics program

- Developer: Agile Molecule
- Release: 2006; 20 years ago
- Stable release: 2.1.4.2
- Operating system: Windows XP/7/8/10
- Platform: x86, Nvidia GPU CUDA
- Available in: English
- Type: Molecular dynamics, molecular graphics
- License: Proprietary
- Website: www.biomolecular-modeling.com/Abalone

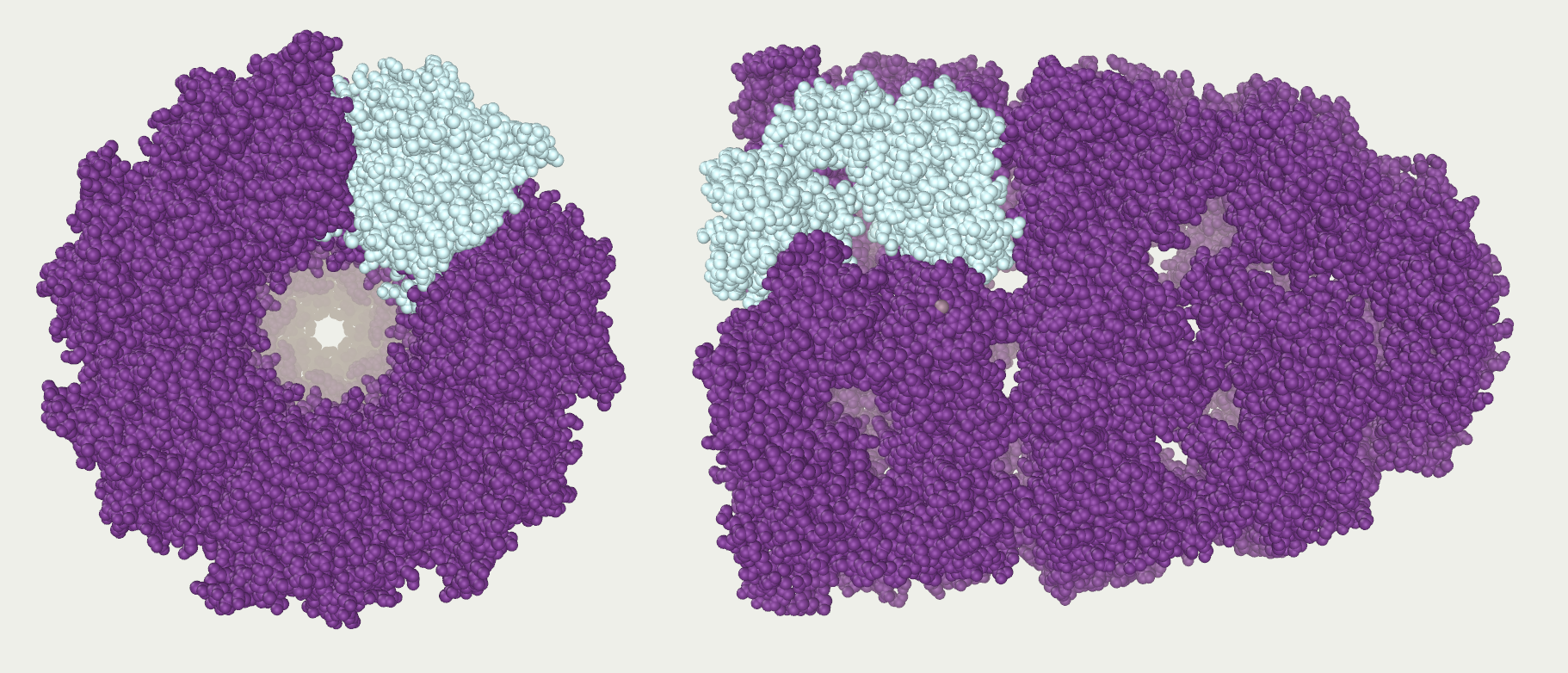
Protein model on Abalone

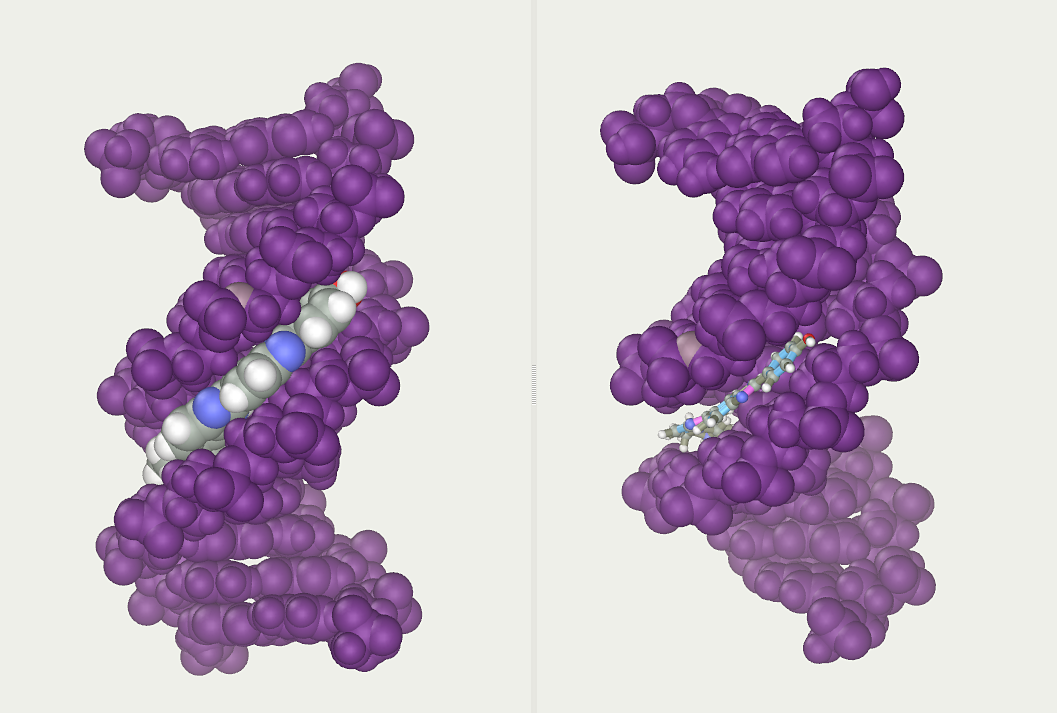
DNA model on Abalone

Abalone is a general purpose molecular dynamics and molecular graphics program for simulations of bio-molecules in a periodic boundary conditions in explicit (flexible SPC water model) or in implicit water models. Mainly designed to simulate the protein folding and DNA-ligand complexes in AMBER force field.

== Key features ==
- 3D molecular graphics
- Automatic Force Field generator for bioelements: H, C, N, O
- Building and editing chemical structures
- Library of building blocks
- Force fields: Assisted Model Building with Energy Refinement (AMBER) 94, 96, 99SB, 03; Optimized Potentials for Liquid Simulations (OPLS)
- Geometry optimizing
- Molecular dynamics with multiple time step integrator
- Hybrid Monte Carlo
- Replica exchange
- Interface with quantum chemistry - ORCA, NWChem, Firefly (PC GAMESS), CP2K
- GPU accelerated molecular modeling

== See also ==
- Comparison of software for molecular mechanics modeling
- Molecular design software
- Ascalaph Designer
- MDynaMix
- Tinker (software)
- NAMD
- GROMACS
- SAMSON
