= OPLS =

Computational chemistry simulated force field

The OPLS (Optimized Potentials for Liquid Simulations) force field was developed by Prof. William L. Jorgensen at Purdue University and later at Yale University, and is being further developed commercially by Schrödinger, Inc.

== Functional form ==
The functional form of the OPLS force field is very similar to that of AMBER:

$E \left(r^N \right ) = E_\mathrm{bonds} + E_\mathrm{angles} + E_\mathrm{dihedrals} + E_\mathrm{nonbonded}$

$E_\mathrm{bonds} = \sum_\mathrm{bonds} K_r (r-r_0)^2 \,$

$E_\mathrm{angles} = \sum_\mathrm{angles} k_\theta (\theta-\theta_0)^2 \,$

$E_\mathrm{dihedrals} = \sum_\mathrm{dihedrals} \left( \frac {V_1} {2} \left [ 1 + \cos (\phi-\phi_1) \right ] + \frac {V_2} {2} \left [ 1 - \cos (2\phi-\phi_2) \right ] + \frac {V_3} {2} \left [ 1 + \cos (3\phi-\phi_3) \right ] + \frac {V_4} {2} \left [ 1 - \cos (4\phi-\phi_4) \right ] \right)$

$E_\mathrm{nonbonded} = \sum_{i>j} f_{ij} \left( \frac {A_{ij}}{r_{ij}^{12}} - \frac {C_{ij}}{r_{ij}^6} + \frac {q_iq_j e^2}{4\pi\epsilon_0 r_{ij}} \right)$

with the combining rules $A_{ij} = \sqrt{A_{ii} A_{jj}}$ and $C_{ij} = \sqrt{C_{ii}C_{jj}}$.

Intramolecular nonbonded interactions $E_\mathrm{nonbonded}$ are counted only for atoms three or more bonds apart; 1,4 interactions are scaled down by the "fudge factor" $f_{ij} = 0.5$, otherwise $f_{ij} = 1.0$. All the interaction sites are centered on the atoms; there are no "lone pairs".

== Parameterization ==
Several sets of OPLS parameters have been published. There is OPLS-ua (united atom), which includes hydrogen atoms next to carbon implicitly in the carbon parameters, and can be used to save simulation time. OPLS-aa (all atom) includes every atom explicitly. Later publications include parameters for other specific functional groups and types of molecules such as carbohydrates. OPLS simulations in aqueous solution typically use the TIP4P or TIP3P water model.

A distinctive feature of the OPLS parameters is that they were optimized to fit experimental properties of liquids, such as density and heat of vaporization, in addition to fitting gas-phase torsional profiles.

== Implementation ==
The reference implementations of the OPLS force field are the BOSS and MCPRO programs developed by Jorgensen. Other packages such as TINKER, GROMACS, PCMODEL, Abalone, LAMMPS, Desmond and NAMD also implement OPLS force fields.
