= Ascalaph Designer =

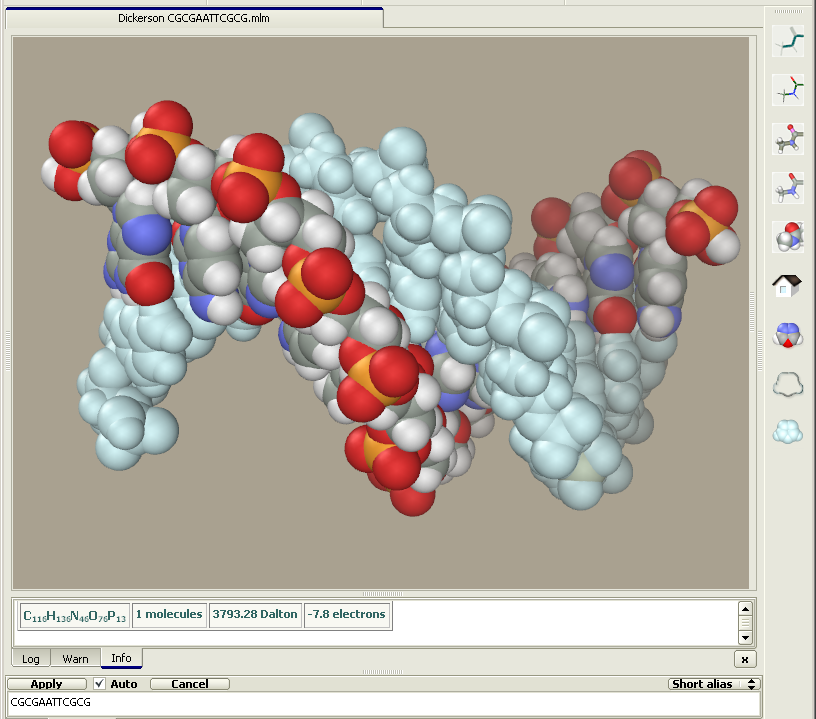
- Ascalaph Designer renders deoxyribonucleic acid (DNA)
- Original author(s): Alexei Nikitin
- Developer(s): Agile Molecule
- Stable release: 1.8.94 / 3 December 2015; 9 years ago
- Written in: C++
- Operating system: Windows
- Platform: x86
- Size: 138.9 MB
- Available in: English
- Type: Molecular modelling
- License: GNU GPL and others including Code Project Open License
- Website: www.biomolecular-modeling.com/Ascalaph

Ascalaph Designer is a computer program for general purpose molecular modelling for molecular design and simulations. It provides a graphical environment for the common programs of quantum and classical molecular modelling ORCA, NWChem, Firefly, CP2K and MDynaMix . The molecular mechanics calculations cover model building, energy optimizations and molecular dynamics. Firefly (formerly named PC GAMESS) covers a wide range of quantum chemistry methods. Ascalaph Designer is free and open-source software, released under the GNU General Public License, version 2 (GPLv2).

== Key features ==
- Molecular model building: polymers, nanotubes, proteins, nucleic acids
- AMBER-OPLS force field family
- Geometry optimization
- Molecular dynamics
- Quantum chemistry
- Flexible SPC water model

== Uses ==
- Nucleic acids
- Proteins
- Modeling lipid bilayers
- Polyelectrolytes
- Ionic liquids
- Thermodynamic properties of liquids
- Chemical force field development

== See also ==
- List of software for molecular mechanics modeling
- Molecular design software
- Molecule editor
- Abalone
