= Tinker (software) =

- Original authors: Jay Ponder, Pengyu Ren, Jean-Philip Piquemal
- Developers: Jay Ponder Lab, Department of Chemistry, Washington University in St. Louis; Pengyu Ren Lab, Department of Biomedical Engineering, the University of Texas at Austin; Jean-Philip Piquemal, Sorbonne University,
- Release: November 26, 1996; 29 years ago
- Stable release: 8.10.2 / April 1, 2022; 4 years ago
- Written in: Fortran 95, CUDA, TypeScript, OpenMP and MPI Parallel
- Operating system: Windows, macOS, Linux, Unix
- Available in: English
- Type: Molecular dynamics
- License: Proprietary freeware
- Website: tinkertools.org
- Repository: github.com/TinkerTools/tinker

Tinker is a suite of computer software applications for molecular dynamics simulation. The codes provide a complete and general set of tools for molecular mechanics and molecular dynamics, with some special features for biomolecules. The core of the software is a modular set of callable routines which allow manipulating coordinates and evaluating potential energy and derivatives via straightforward means.

Tinker works on Windows, macOS and Linux. The source code is available free of charge to non-commercial users under a proprietary license. The code is written in portable Fortran 95 or CUDA with common extensions, and some C.

Core developers are: (a) the Jay Ponder lab, at the Department of Chemistry, Washington University in St. Louis, St. Louis, Missouri. Laboratory head Ponder is Full Professor of Chemistry, and of Biochemistry & Molecular Biophysics; (b) the Pengyu Ren lab , at the Department of Biomedical Engineering University of Texas in Austin, Austin, Texas. Laboratory head Ren is Full Professor of Biomedical Engineering; (c) Jean-Philip Piquemal's research team at Laboratoire de Chimie Théorique, Department of Chemistry, Sorbonne University, Paris, France. Research team head Piquemal is Full Professor of theoretical chemistry.

== Features ==
The Tinker package is based on several related codes: (a) canonical CPU-based Tinker, (b) Tinker-GPU as a direct extension of canonical Tinker to GPU systems, (c) Tinker-HP for massively parallel MPI applications on hybrid CPU and GPU-based systems, (d) Tinker Studio for launching and visualization of Tinker calculations via a TypeScript-based graphical interface, and (e) Poltype 2 for parameterization of Tiinker-style polarizable force fields such as AMOEBA. All of the Tinker codes are available from the TinkerTools organization site on GitHub. Additional information is available from the TinkerTools community web site.

Programs are provided to perform many functions including:

1. energy minimizing over Cartesian coordinates, torsional angles, or rigid bodies via conjugate gradient, variable metric or a truncated Newton method
2. molecular, stochastic, and rigid body dynamics with periodic boundaries and control of temperature and pressure
3. normal mode vibrational analysis
4. distance geometry including an efficient random pairwise metrization
5. building protein and nucleic acid structures from sequence
6. simulated annealing with various cooling protocols
7. analysis and breakdown of single point potential energies
8. verification of analytical derivatives of standard and user defined potentials
9. location of a transition state between two minima
10. full energy surface search via a Conformation Scanning method
11. free energy calculations via free energy perturbation or weighted histogram analysis
12. fitting of intermolecular potential parameters to structural and thermodynamic data
13. global optimizing via energy surface smoothing, including a Potential Smoothing and Search (PSS) method

== Awards ==
- Tinker-HP received the 2018 Atos-Joseph Fourier Prize in High Performance Computing.

== See also ==
- List of software for Monte Carlo molecular modeling
- Comparison of software for molecular mechanics modeling
- Molecular dynamics
- Molecular geometry
- Molecular design software
- Comparison of force field implementations
