= AMBER =

Molecular dynamics software package

Assisted Model Building with Energy Refinement (AMBER)
- Original authors: Peter Kollman, Version1: +Paul Weiner. Version 2: + U Chandra Singh; V3. + David Pearlman, James Caldwell, William Ross, Thomas Cheatham, Stephen Debolt, David Ferguson, George Seibel; Later versions: David Case, Tom Cheatham, Ken Merz, Adrian Roitberg, Carlos Simmerling, Ray Luo, Junmei Wang, Ross Walker
- Developer: University of California, San Francisco
- Release: 1981; 45 years ago
- Stable release: Amber23, AmberTools23 / April 21, 2023; 3 years ago
- Written in: C, C++, Fortran
- Operating system: Windows, OS X, Linux, Unix, CNK
- Platform: x86, Nvidia GPUs, Blue Gene
- Size: Varies
- Available in: English
- Type: Molecular dynamics
- License: Amber: Proprietary; AmberTools: GPL, public domain, other open-source
- Website: ambermd.org

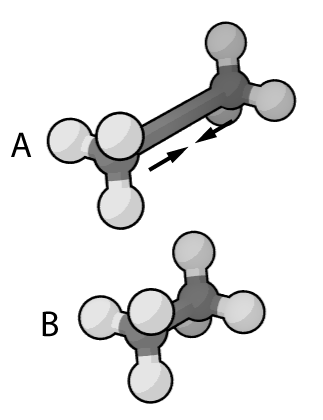
AMBER is used to minimize the bond stretching energy of this ethane molecule.

Assisted Model Building with Energy Refinement (AMBER) is a molecular dynamics software package originally developed by Peter Kollman's group at the University of California, San Francisco. It has also, subsequently, come to designate a family of force fields for molecular dynamics of biomolecules that can be used both within the AMBER software suite and with many modern computational platforms.

The original version of the AMBER software package was written by Paul Weiner as a post-doc in Peter Kollman's laboratory, and was released in 1981.

Subsequently, U Chandra Singh expanded AMBER as a post-doc in Kollman's laboratory, adding molecular dynamics and free energy capabilities.

The next iteration of AMBER was started around 1987 by a group of developers in (and associated with) the Kollman lab, including David Pearlman, David Case, James Caldwell, William Ross, Thomas Cheatham, Stephen DeBolt, David Ferguson, and George Seibel. This team headed development for more than a decade and introduced a variety of improvements, including significant expansion of the free energy capabilities, accommodation for modern parallel and array processing hardware platforms (Cray, Star, etc.), restructuring of the code and revision control for greater maintainability, PME Ewald summations, tools for NMR refinement, and many others.

Currently, AMBER is maintained by an active collaboration between David Case at Rutgers University, Tom Cheatham at the University of Utah, Adrian Roitberg at University of Florida, Ken Merz at Michigan State University, Carlos Simmerling at Stony Brook University, Ray Luo at UC Irvine, and Junmei Wang at University of Pittsburgh.

== Force field ==
The term AMBER force field generally refers to the functional form used by the family of AMBER force fields. This form includes several parameters; each member of the family of AMBER force fields provides values for these parameters and has its own name.

=== Functional form ===
The functional form of the AMBER force field is

$$V(r^N)=\sum_{i \in \text{bonds}} {k_b}_i (l_i-l_i^0)^2 + \sum_{i \in \text{angles}} {k_a}_i (\theta_i - \theta_i^0)^2$$

$+ \sum_{i \in \text{torsions}} \sum_n \frac{1}{2} V_i^n [1+\cos(n \omega_i - \gamma_i)]$ $+\sum_{j=1} ^{N-1} \sum_{i=j+1} ^N f_{ij}\biggl\{\epsilon_{ij}\biggl[\left(\frac{r^{0}_{ij}}{r_{ij}} \right)^{12} - 2\left(\frac{r^{0}_{ij}}{r_{ij}} \right)^{6} \biggr]+ \frac{q_iq_j}{4\pi \epsilon_0 r_{ij}}\biggr\}$

Despite the term force field, this equation defines the potential energy of the system; the force is the derivative of this potential relative to position.

The meanings of right hand side terms are:

- First term (summing over bonds): represents the energy between covalently bonded atoms. This harmonic (ideal spring) force is a good approximation near the equilibrium bond length, but becomes increasingly poor as atoms separate.
- Second term (summing over angles): represents the energy due to the geometry of electron orbitals involved in covalent bonding.
- Third term (summing over torsions): represents the energy for twisting a bond due to bond order (e.g., double bonds) and neighboring bonds or lone pairs of electrons. One bond may have more than one of these terms, such that the total torsional energy is expressed as a Fourier series.
- Fourth term (double summation over $i$ and $j$): represents the non-bonded energy between all atom pairs, which can be decomposed into van der Waals (first term of summation) and electrostatic (second term of summation) energies.

The form of the van der Waals energy is calculated using the equilibrium distance ($r^{0}_{ij}$) and well depth ($\epsilon$). The factor of $2$ ensures that the equilibrium distance is $r^{0}_{ij}$. The energy is sometimes reformulated in terms of $\sigma$, where $r^{0}_{ij} = 2^{1/6}(\sigma)$, as used e.g. in the implementation of the softcore potentials.

The form of the electrostatic energy used here assumes that the charges due to the protons and electrons in an atom can be represented by a single point charge (or in the case of parameter sets that employ lone pairs, a small number of point charges.)

=== Parameter sets ===
To use the AMBER force field, it is necessary to have values for the parameters of the force field (e.g. force constants, equilibrium bond lengths and angles, charges). A fairly large number of these parameter sets exist, and are described in detail in the AMBER software user manual. Each parameter set has a name, and provides parameters for certain types of molecules.

- Peptide, protein, and nucleic acid parameters are provided by parameter sets with names starting with "ff" and containing a two digit year number, for instance "ff99". As of 2025 the primary protein model used by the AMBER suit is the ff19SB force field. Additional force fields available as of 2025 include "ff14SBonlysc", "ff14SB", "ff15ipq" (implicitly polarized, including fluorinated aromatic amino acids), "ff15ipq-m" (protein mimetics), "fb15" (force balance), "ff03" (ff99 with quantum-derived peptide changes), "ff03ua" (united-atom approximation).
  - Since 2011, nucleic acid parameters have been split out as separate force fields such as OL24 (DNA 2015; built on top of OL3 RNA 2011). OL3 is itself a refinement of ff99bsc0 (ff99 with Barcelona alpha/gamma torsion correction) by changing glycosidic torsion. OL3 is present in ff10, ff12SB and ff14SB. AmberTools25 also includes Tumuc1 for DNA.
- General AMBER force field (GAFF) provides parameters for small organic molecules to facilitate simulations of drugs and small molecule ligands in conjunction with biomolecules. It was designed for changes assigned via restrained electrostatic potential (quantum calculation), but a fast semi-empirical method called AM1-BCC works well. A new version is the more accurate GAFF2 of 2015; a reparameteriation of AM1-BCC for GAFF2 called ABCG2 was released in 2024.
- The GLYCAM force fields have been developed by Rob Woods for simulating carbohydrates. The most recent is GLYCAM-06j.
- The primary force field used in the AMBER suit for lipids is lipid21.

The recommended force fields are verified to work well with each other when mixed and matched. ff19SB works best with the OPC water model; ff14SBonlysc works well with OPC3 or implicit solvent; ff14SB is tuned for TIP3P.

==== Unofficial variants ====
- Forcefield_PTM – An AMBER-based forcefield and webtool for modeling common post-translational modifications of amino acids in proteins developed by Chris Floudas and coworkers. It uses the ff03 charge model and has several side-chain torsion corrections parameterized to match the quantum chemical rotational surface.
- Forcefield_NCAA - An AMBER-based forcefield and webtool for modeling common non-natural amino acids in proteins in condensed-phase simulations using the ff03 charge model. The charges have been reported to be correlated with hydration free energies of corresponding side-chain analogs.

AMBER has integrated modified amino acid changes into phosaa14SB/phosaa19SB and ff14SB_modAA. Parameters from ff15ipq are useful for unnatural modifications. Official guidance recommends mixing in these parameters to the main model.

== Software ==
The AMBER software suite provides a set of programs to apply the AMBER forcefields to simulations of biomolecules. It is written in the programming languages Fortran 90 and C, with support for most major Unix-like operating systems and compilers. Development is conducted by a loose association of mostly academic labs. New versions are released usually in the spring of even numbered years. AMBER 10 was released in April 2008.

The software is available under a site license agreement, which includes full source and allows use in any number of computers under the same affiliation. AMBER 10 was priced at US$500 for non-commercial and US$20,000 for commercial organizations. AMBER 24 is priced at US$0 for academic/non-profit/government, US$500 for commercial hardware benchmarking and compiler-testing purposes, US$2000 for not-for-profit computing centers with non-profit users, and US$25000 for industrial purposes (US$20000 for recurring customers). Use by for-profit computing centers requires special licensing deals.

=== Programs ===
- pmemd is a somewhat more feature-limited reimplementation of SANDER (see below) by Bob Duke. It was designed for parallel computing, and performs significantly better than SANDER when running on more than 8–16 processors.
  - pmemd.cuda runs simulations on machines with graphics processing units (GPUs).
  - gem.pmemd (AmberTools) handles the extra parameters in the polarizable AMOEBA force field and GEM force field.
- nmode calculates normal modes.
- NAB is a built-in nucleic acid building environment made to aid in the process of manipulating proteins and nucleic acids where an atomic level of description will aid computing.

=== AmberTools ===
AmberTools is a collection of tools that work well with AMBER as well as each other. It is available free of change. Most components are available under GNU GPL, some others as GNU LGPL, public domain, or a different open-source license.

- Antechamber automates the process of parameterizing small organic molecules using GAFF or GAFF2.
- cpptraj is a rewritten version of ptraj made in C++ to give faster numerical analysis of simulation results. Several actions have been made parallelizable with OpenMP and MPI. pytraj is its Python wrapper.
- LEaP (tleap/xleap) prepares input files for the simulation programs.
- Simulated Annealing with NMR-Derived Energy Restraints (SANDER) is the central simulation program and provides facilities for energy minimizing and molecular dynamics with a wide variety of options.
- MM-PBSA (MMPBSA.py) allows implicit solvent calculations on snap shots from molecular dynamics simulations.

=== Additional tools ===
AMBER includes no visualizing abilities, which is commonly performed with Visual Molecular Dynamics (VMD). Ptraj is now unsupported as of AmberTools 13.

== See also ==
- Comparison of software for molecular mechanics modeling
- Comparison of force field implementations
- Molecular dynamics
- Molecular geometry
- Molecular design software
- Molecular mechanics
- MDynaMix
- Ascalaph Designer
- BOSS (molecular mechanics)
- CHARMM
- GROMACS
- Reverse Pharmacology
- OPLS
- Yasara
- Folding@home
