= YASARA =

Yet Another Scientific Artificial Reality Application
- Original authors: Elmar Krieger; Jacobus van Meel
- Developers: YASARA Biosciences; WHAT IF Foundation; Spronk NMR Consultancy
- Release: November 1993; 32 years ago
- Stable release: 24.10.5 / 5 October 2024
- Written in: C, assembly, Python
- Operating system: Windows, Linux, OS X
- Platform: x86
- Available in: English
- Type: Molecular modelling
- License: Proprietary, free version for elementary structure work
- Website: www.yasara.org

Yet Another Scientific Artificial Reality Application (YASARA) is a computer program for molecular visualization, modelling and dynamics. It has many scientific uses, as expressed by the large number of scientific articles mentioning the software. The free version of YASARA is well suited to bioinformatics education. A series of freely available bioinformatics courses exist that use this software; see examples thereof at the Center for Molecular and Biomolecular Informatics (CMBI) education pages.

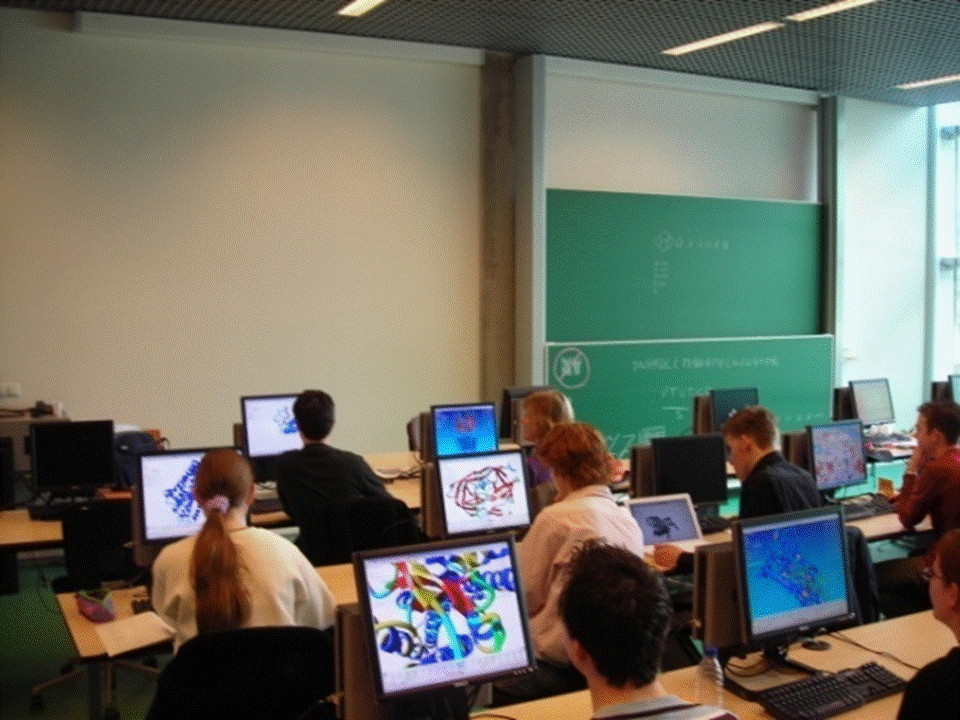
Students working on an educational task using YASARA.

Learning to dock ligands with YASARA.

== See also ==
- List of molecular graphics systems
- Comparison of software for molecular mechanics modeling
- Molecular graphics
- Molecular design software

== Bibliography ==
- Krieger E, Koraimann G, Vriend G (May 2002). "Increasing the precision of comparative models with YASARA NOVA—a self-parameterizing force field". Proteins. 47 (3): 393–402. doi:10.1002/prot.10104. PMID 11948792.
- Modelling: Krieger E, Vriend G (Feb 2002). "Models@Home: distributed computing in bioinformatics using a screensaver based approach". Bioinformatics. 18 (2): 315–8. doi:10.1093/bioinformatics/18.2.315. PMID 11847079.
- Dynamics: Krieger E, Darden T, Nabuurs SB, Finkelstein A, Vriend G (Dec 2004). "Making optimal use of empirical energy functions: force-field parameterization in crystal space". Proteins. 57 (4): 678–83. doi:10.1002/prot.20251. PMID 15390263.
