= NAMD =

Molecular dynamics simulation software

Nanoscale Molecular Dynamics
- Developers: University of Illinois Urbana–Champaign: Theoretical and Computational Biophysics Group (TCBG), Parallel Programming Laboratory (PPL)
- Release: 1995; 31 years ago
- Stable release: 3.0.2 / August 27, 2025; 13 months ago
- Written in: C++
- Operating system: Cross-platform: Windows, Linux, macOS, Unix
- Platform: x86, x86-64
- Available in: English
- Type: Molecular dynamics simulation
- License: Proprietary, freeware for noncommercial use
- Website: www.ks.uiuc.edu/Research/namd
- Repository: gitlab.com/tcbgUIUC/namd

Nanoscale Molecular Dynamics (NAMD, formerly Not Another Molecular Dynamics Program) is computer software for molecular dynamics simulation, written using the Charm++ parallel programming model (not to be confused with CHARMM). It is noted for its parallel efficiency and is often used to simulate large systems (millions of atoms). It has been developed by the collaboration of the Theoretical and Computational Biophysics Group (TCB) and the Parallel Programming Laboratory (PPL) at the University of Illinois Urbana–Champaign.

It was introduced in 1995 by Nelson et al. as a parallel molecular dynamics code enabling interactive simulation by linking to the visualization code VMD. NAMD has since matured, adding many features and scaling beyond 500,000 processor cores.

NAMD has an interface to quantum chemistry packages ORCA and MOPAC, as well as a scripted interface to many other quantum packages. Together with Visual Molecular Dynamics (VMD) and QwikMD, NAMD's interface provides access to hybrid QM/MM simulations in an integrated, comprehensive, customizable, and easy-to-use suite.

NAMD is available as freeware for non-commercial use by individuals, academic institutions, and corporations for in-house business uses.

== See also ==
- Charm++
- Comparison of software for molecular mechanics modeling
