= List of computational chemistry software =

This is a list of computational chemistry software used for electronic structure calculations, molecular property prediction, and related simulations. The programs listed below implement methods such as Hartree–Fock, Post–Hartree–Fock, density-functional theory, and relativistic formalisms for molecular, biological, and solid-state chemistry systems.

== Quantum chemistry ==
Software	Primary domain / method	License
ABINIT	DFT / solid-state	Open-source
ACES	Coupled-cluster / ab initio	Free
ADF	DFT / relativistic	Commercial
BigDFT	Wavelet-based DFT	Open-source
CASTEP	Plane-wave DFT / solid-state	Commercial
Columbus	Multireference ab initio	Free
CP2K	DFT / MD / QM/MM	Open-source
CRYSTAL	Periodic DFT / solid-state	Commercial
Dalton	HF / DFT / response theory	Open-source
DIRAC	Relativistic quantum chemistry	Open-source
DMol3	DFT	Commercial
FHI-aims	All-electron DFT	Free
Firefly	HF / DFT / post-HF (GAMESS fork)	Free
FLEUR	FLAPW DFT (solid-state)	Open-source
FreeON	Linear-scaling DFT	Open-source
GAMESS (US)	HF / DFT	Free
GAMESS (UK)	HF / DFT	Free
Gaussian	HF / DFT / post-HF	Commercial
Jaguar	DFT / QM	Commercial
MADNESS	Multiresolution adaptive DFT	Open-source
Massively parallel quantum chemistry	Electronic structure frameworks	Open-source
MOLCAS	Multiconfigurational QC	Open-source
MOLPRO	High-level ab initio	Commercial
MOPAC	Semi-empirical QM	Open-source
NWChem	HF / DFT / MD / QM/MM	Open-source
Octopus	TDDFT / real-space DFT	Open-source
ONETEP	Linear-scaling DFT	Commercial
PARSEC	Real-space DFT	Open-source
PLATO	Linear scaling DFT	Open-source
PQS	HF / DFT / post-HF	Commercial
PSI4	HF / DFT / post-HF	Open-source
PySCF	Quantum chemistry framework	Open-source
Q-Chem	HF / DFT / post-HF	Commercial
Qbox	First-principles MD	Open-source
Quantum ESPRESSO	Plane-wave DFT	Open-source
SIESTA	DFT with numerical atomic orbitals	Open-source
TeraChem	GPU-accelerated QM	Commercial
TURBOMOLE	DFT / post-HF	Commercial
VASP	Plane-wave DFT	Commercial
WIEN2k	Full-potential LAPW DFT	Commercial
YAMBO	Many-body perturbation theory (GW/BSE)	Open-source

== Molecular dynamics ==
Software	Primary domain / method	License
Abalone	Molecular mechanics / MD	Commercial
Advanced Simulation Library	GPU molecular simulation	Open-source
AMBER	Biomolecular dynamics	Commercial
Ascalaph Designer	Molecular mechanics / MD	Free
BALL	Biomolecular simulation framework	Open-source
Biskit	MD analysis	Open-source
Car–Parrinello molecular dynamics	First-principles MD	Open-source
CHARMM	Molecular mechanics / molecular dynamics / biomolecular simulations	Commercial
Discovery Studio	MD / modeling	Commercial
GROMACS	Classical MD	Open-source
LAMMPS	MD / particle simulation	Open-source
Molden	Visualization + interface for MD/QC	Free
MOE	MD / modeling	Commercial
NAMD	Biomolecular MD	Open-source
Newton-X	Surface hopping MD	Open-source
OpenAtom	First-principles MD	Open-source
OpenMM	GPU-accelerated MD	Open-source
RMG	Kinetic modeling / reactive MD	Open-source

== Molecular modeling software ==
Software	Primary domain / method	License
Abalone	Molecular mechanics / MD	Commercial
AlphaFold	Protein structure prediction	Open-source
Amsterdam Density Functional	DFT / QM modeling	Commercial
APBS	Electrostatics / biomolecules	Open-source
Ascalaph Designer	Molecular modeling / MD	Free
AutoDock	Molecular docking	Open-source
Avizo	Visualization / modeling	Commercial
Avogadro	Molecular modeling / visualization	Open-source
BALL	Biomolecular modeling / MD	Open-source
BIOVIA	Molecular modeling suite	Commercial
BOSS	Molecular mechanics	Commercial
Chemical Computing Group	Molecular modeling / docking	Commercial
Chemical WorkBench	Kinetics / modeling	Commercial
Cn3D	3D visualization / structure	Free
CoNTub	Modeling tubular structures	Free
Coot	Crystallography / model building	Open-source
CP2K	QM/MM / modeling	Open-source
CS-ROSETTA	Protein modeling	Open-source
CYANA	NMR structure modeling	Commercial
DOCK	Molecular docking	Open-source
Empire	Molecular modeling	Commercial
ESyPred3D	Homology modeling	Free
ECCE	Visualization / workflow	Open-source
EzMol	Molecular visualization	Free
FlexAID	Molecular docking	Free
Folding@home	Distributed MD / protein folding	Open-source
FoldX	Protein stability / modeling	Commercial
Glide	Molecular docking	Commercial
Jmol	Molecular visualization	Open-source
Khimera	Molecular modeling	Commercial
Lead Finder	Molecular docking	Commercial
LeDock	Molecular docking	Commercial
LigandScout	Pharmacophore modeling / docking	Commercial
LIGPLOT	Ligand-protein interactions visualization	Free
MacroModel	Molecular mechanics / modeling	Commercial
MBN Explorer	Molecular dynamics / modeling	Commercial
MODELLER	Homology modeling	Open-source
Molden	Visualization / analysis	Free
Molecular Discovery	Molecular modeling suite	Commercial
Molecular Modelling Toolkit	Molecular modeling / scripting	Open-source
MOE	Molecular modeling suite	Commercial
Molecular Playground	Visualization / learning tool	Free
Molekel	Molecular visualization	Open-source
Ms2	Molecular modeling	Free
NUPACK	Nucleic acid structure modeling	Open-source
ParaSurf	Surface analysis / modeling	Commercial
PyMOL	Molecular visualization	Commercial
QuteMol	Molecular visualization	Open-source
RAPTOR	Molecular modeling	Commercial
RasMol	Molecular visualization	Open-source
rDock	Molecular docking	Commercial
Schrödinger	Molecular modeling suite	Commercial
Scigress	Molecular modeling suite	Commercial
ShelXle	Crystallography modeling	Open-source
Sirius visualization software	Molecular visualization	Commercial
Spartan	Molecular modeling / QM	Commercial
Swiss-model	Homology modeling	Free
Chimera	Molecular modeling / visualization	Open-source
VMD	MD visualization / analysis	Open-source
VOTCA	Coarse-grained MD / modeling	Open-source
WHAT IF	Structure modeling / analysis	Commercial
Winmostar	Molecular modeling / QM / MD / workflow	Commercial
YASARA	Molecular modeling / visualization	Commercial

== Cheminformatics, docking, and modeling ==
Software	Primary domain / method	License
AIMAll	Atoms-in-molecules analysis	Commercial
AlvaDesc	Molecular descriptors / QSAR	Commercial
Atomistix ToolKit	Nanomaterials modeling	Commercial
Atomistix Virtual NanoLab	Visualization / workflow	Commercial
Autochem	Molecular modeling	Commercial
Avogadro	Molecular modeling / visualization	Open-source
Biskit	Bioinformatics / MD analysis	Open-source
Chemicalize	Web cheminformatics	Commercial
Chemistry Development Kit	Cheminformatics / molecular modeling toolkit	Open-source
Chemical WorkBench	Kinetic modeling	Commercial
CHEMKIN	Reaction kinetics	Commercial
CrystalExplorer	Crystal structure analysis	Commercial
EzMol	Molecular visualization	Free
Gabedit	QM/MD GUI	Open-source
Ghemical	Molecular modeling	Open-source
Glide (docking)	Docking	Commercial
JME Molecule Editor	2D molecule editor	Free
JOELib	Cheminformatics	Open-source
Khimera	Molecular modeling	Commercial
Molecular design software	Molecular modeling suite	Commercial
Open Babel	Cheminformatics / file conversion / molecular toolkit	Open-source
Pipeline Pilot	Cheminformatics workflow	Commercial
RDKit	Cheminformatics and ML	Open-source
SAMSON	Modeling platform	Commercial
Scigress	Molecular modeling	Commercial
SHELX	Crystallographic refinement	Open-source
Spartan	QM + molecular modeling	Commercial

== Utilities and frameworks ==
Software	Primary domain / method	License
Aqion	pH / aqueous chemistry modeling	Free
Cantera	Chemical kinetics / thermodynamics	Open-source
CASINO	Quantum Monte Carlo	Open-source
CONQUEST	Linear-scaling DFT	Open-source
COSILAB	Combustion modeling	Commercial
DP code	Density-functional perturbation theory	Open-source
EXC code	Excited-state calculations	Open-source
ECCE	Workflow / visualization	Open-source
FDMNES	X-ray spectroscopy calculations	Open-source
Internal Coordinate Mechanics	Conformational modeling	Open-source
Kinetic PreProcessor	Chemical kinetics	Free
LHASA	Retrosynthetic planning	Free
NanoLanguage	Scripting language for ATK	Commercial
OctaDist	Geometry analysis	Open-source
Quantum Chemistry Program Exchange	QC source code archive	Mixed licenses
Spinach	Spin dynamics simulations	Open-source
Valence bond programs	VB theory packages	Mixed licenses

== See also ==
- Comparison of nucleic acid simulation software
- Computational Chemistry List
- Crystallographic database
- Crystallography Open Database
- List of chemical process simulators
- List of chemistry journals
- List of computational chemists
- List of computer-assisted organic synthesis software
- List of molecular graphics systems
- List of software for Monte Carlo molecular modeling
- List of software for nanostructures modeling
