= ATK =

ATK may refer to:

== Companies ==
- Alliant Techsystems, an American aerospace, defense, and sporting goods company, now part of Northrop Grumman
- ATK motorcycles, an off-road motorcycle manufacturer
- A.T. Kearney, a management consulting firm
- ATK Thiokol, or ATK Launch Systems Group, former names of Thiokol, an aerospace, defense and commercial products company, later part of Orbital ATK

== Software ==
- Accessibility Toolkit, a GNOME API for developing accessible applications
- Andrew Toolkit, part of the Andrew Project used to create and distribute documents
- Atomistix ToolKit, software for atomic-scale modeling

== Sports ==
- ATK (football club), Indian football club active from 2014 to 2020

== Other uses ==
- Arachidonyl trifluoromethyl ketone, an analog of arachidonic acid
- Aboriginal traditional knowledge, cultural knowledge of aboriginal peoples
- America's Test Kitchen, a cooking show on PBS
- Arbetstidsförkortning, a system of additional leave entitlement in Sweden
- Atqasuk Edward Burnell Sr. Memorial Airport, Atqasuk, Alaska (IATA Code: ATK)
- Bruton's tyrosine kinase, a protein
- Kiribati Grand Order (Ana Tokabeti Kiribati, post-nominals: ATK)

== See also ==
- Attack (disambiguation)
