= Atomistix =

Danish software company

Atomistix A/S
- Type: A/S
- Industry: Nanotechnology software
- Founded: 2003 in Copenhagen, Denmark
- Headquarters: Copenhagen, Denmark
- Products: Atomic scale modeling tools
- Number of employees: 50 (2007), 20 (2008)
- Website: https://www.synopsys.com/manufacturing/quantumatk.html

Atomistix A/S was a software company developing tools for atomic scale modelling. It was headquartered in Copenhagen, Denmark, with a subsidiary for Asia Pacific in Singapore and for the Americas in California. In September 2008 Atomistix A/S went bankrupt, but in December 2008 the newly founded company QuantumWise announced that they had acquired all assets from the Atomistix estate and would continue the development and marketing of the products Atomistix ToolKit and Atomistix Virtual NanoLab. QuantumWise was then acquired by Synopsys in 2017.

== History ==
The company was founded in October 2003 by Dr. Kurt Stokbro, Dr. Jeremy Taylor and Dr. Thomas Magnussen. Dr. Stokbro and Dr. Taylor are co-authors on the article introducing the electron transport method and program TranSIESTA (based on the SIESTA program) for academic research. This method, and methods used in Dr. Taylor Ph.D. research, was the starting point for Atomistix first product, TranSIESTA-C. The C refers to the program being written in the C programming language as opposed to Fortran in which TranSIESTA was written. This code had been completely reengineered and further developed into the commercial products marketed by the company today.

Since the very beginning the company had been working in close collaboration with the Nano-Science Center at the Niels Bohr Institute of Copenhagen University, to enhance the product development, and had instituted cooperations with leading nanotechnology centers, experts and private companies around the world.

== Business ==
The management team consisted of:

- Børge Witthøft, president and chief executive officer (CEO).
- Dr. Jeremy Taylor, co-founder and chief technical officer (CTO).
- Klaus Melchior, chief operating officer (COO) and chief financial officer (CFO).
- Niels Nielsen, vice president (VP) sales and marketing.

== Products ==
Atomistix A/S provided the following products:

- Atomistix ToolKit (ATK)
- Atomistix Virtual NanoLab (VNL)

Legacy Products:

- IView
- TranSIESTA-C

These products represented a package of integrated software modules for quantum chemistry modelling, providing a user-friendly graphical interface interaction to complex computational methods.

From the usability point of view, the setup of the computation is done through Atomistix Virtual NanoLab, a metaphoric interface, mimicking in silico the approach of an experiment in a real laboratory. The underlying computational engine is the Atomistix ToolKit (ATK) which is the next generation of TranSIESTA-C. ATK also has a Python based interface NanoLanguage and a text file interface.

The methods used in the software products are based primarily on density functional theory (DFT) and non-equilibrium Green's function (NEGF) techniques and also all the underlying quantum mechanics.

== See also ==
- Semiconductor
- Nanotechnology
- Molecular modelling
- Software for molecular modeling

== Sources ==
- Brandbyge, Mads; Mozos, José-Luis; Ordejón, Pablo; Taylor, Jeremy; Stokbro, Kurt (2002-03-22). "Density-functional method for nonequilibrium electron transport". Physical Review B. 65 (16) 165401. American Physical Society (APS). arXiv:cond-mat/0110650. Bibcode:2002PhRvB..65p5401B. doi:10.1103/physrevb.65.165401. ISSN 0163-1829.
- Soler, José M; Artacho, Emilio; Gale, Julian D; García, Alberto; Junquera, Javier; Ordejón, Pablo; Sánchez-Portal, Daniel (2002-03-08). "The SIESTA method forab initioorder-Nmaterials simulation". Journal of Physics: Condensed Matter. 14 (11). IOP Publishing: 2745–2779. arXiv:cond-mat/0104182. Bibcode:2002JPCM...14.2745S. doi:10.1088/0953-8984/14/11/302. ISSN 0953-8984. S2CID 250812001.
