= Etox (disambiguation) =

Etox is a Turkish automobile manufacturer.

Etox may also refer to:

- eTOX, a toxicology consortium
- 2-Ethyl-2-oxazoline (EtOx)
