= David Lary =

British-American atmospheric scientist (born 1965)

David John Lary
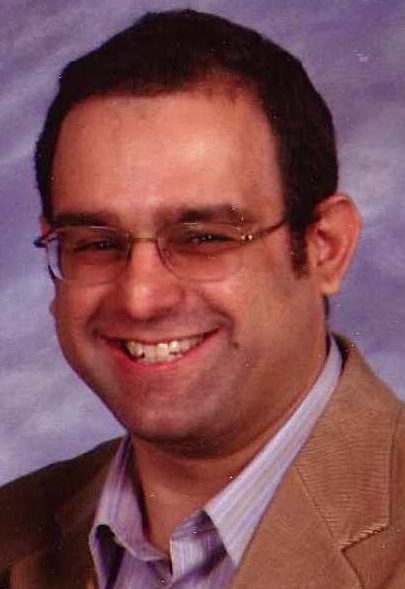
- Born: December 7, 1965 (age 60)
- Education: King's College London and University of Cambridge
- Known for: Chemical data assimilation and machine learning
- Scientific career
- Fields: Physics, chemistry, computing, remote sensing
- Doctoral advisor: John A Pyle

David J. Lary (born 7 December 1965) is a British-American atmospheric scientist whose work focuses on applying computer and information systems in Earth science. His main contributions have been to highlight the role of aerosols in the atmosphere and their reactions with bromine, the use of data assimilation for validating satellite data, and the use of AI for monitoring remote satellite sensors.

He is author of the AutoChem, NASA software for modeling atmospheric chemistry and chemical data assimilation, which has been approved for use outside the agency. AutoChem has won five NASA awards and been cited in numerous peer reviewed articles. Lary has also written more than 200 publications receiving more than 7,500 citations.

== Education ==
David Lary completed his education in the United Kingdom. He received a first class double honors BSc in physics and chemistry from King's College London (1987) with the Sambrooke Exhibition Prize in Natural Science, and a PhD in atmospheric chemistry from the University of Cambridge, Department of Chemistry while at Churchill College (1991). His thesis described the first chemical scheme for the ECMWF numerical weather prediction model.

== Career ==
He then held post-doctoral research assistant and associate positions at the University of Cambridge until receiving a Royal Society research fellowship in 1996 (also at Cambridge). From 1998 to 2000 he held a joint position at Cambridge and the University of Tel-Aviv as a senior lecturer and Alon fellow. In 2001 he joined NASA/UMBC/GEST as the first distinguished Goddard fellow in earth science. Between 2001 and 2010 he was part of various branches at NASA Goddard Space Flight Center including the Global Modeling and Assimilation Office, the Atmospheric Chemistry and Dynamics Branch, the Software Integration and Visualization Office, and the Goddard Earth Sciences (GES) Data and Information Services Center (DISC).

In 2010 he moved to the William B. Hanson Center for Space Sciences as a professor of physics at the University of Texas at Dallas, where he has focused on the health effects of atmospheric particulates, and developing a fleet of unmanned aerial vehicles for a variety of agricultural, environmental, and meteorological applications. He is also adjunct professor in data science and machine learning at Southern Methodist University, adjunct professor at Baylor University Center for Astrophysics, Space Physics & Engineering Research, a scholar of the Institute for Integrative Health, adjunct professor at the School of Public Health, University of North Texas Health Science Center, and the departments of electrical engineering, geographic information systems, and bioengineering at the University of Texas at Dallas, and a United States Special Operations Command Fellow at SOFWERX by J5, the Futures Mission Directorate. In 2021 David was appointed adjunct professor of military/emergency medicine at the Uniformed Services University of the Health Sciences, a UT Dallas Center for Brain Health Investigator, and research scholar at the U.S. Department of Veterans Affairs' Complex Exposure Threats Center Network (CETC), part of the War Related Illness and Injury Study Center.
