= Z-matrix =

Z-matrix may mean:

- Z-matrix (chemistry), a table of the locations of atoms comprising a molecule
- Z-matrix (mathematics), a matrix whose off-diagonal entries are less than or equal to zero

It may also refer to:

- The matrix of Z-parameters, a matrix characterizing an electrical network
