= Xiaoyan Tang =

Chinese environmental scientist (1932–2025)

Xiaoyan Tang (died June 11, 2025) was a Chinese atmospheric chemist best known for her research on air pollution. She taught at the Peking University and was elected as an academician to the Chinese Academy of Engineering.
