= Molecular design software =

Molecular design software is notable software for molecular modeling, that provides special support for developing molecular models de novo.

In contrast to the usual molecular modeling programs, such as for molecular dynamics and quantum chemistry, such software directly supports the aspects related to constructing molecular models, including:

- Molecular graphics
- interactive molecular drawing and conformational editing
- building polymeric molecules, crystals, and solvated systems
- partial charges development
- geometry optimization
- support for the different aspects of force field development

== Comparison of software covering the major aspects of molecular design ==
- 3D – molecular graphics
- Mouse – drawing molecule by mouse
- Poly – polymer building
- DNA – nucleic acid building
- Pept – peptide building
- Cryst – crystal building
- Solv – solvent addition
- Q – partial charges
- Dock – docking
- Min – optimization
- MM – molecular mechanics
- QM – quantum mechanics
- FF – supports force field development
- QSAR – 2D, 3D, and group QSAR
- FBLD - Fragment Based Ligand Design
- FE - Free Energy approximations
- SN - Space Navigation

	3D	Mouse	Poly	DNA	Pept	Cryst	Solv	Q	Dock	Min	MM	QM	FF	QSAR	FBLD	FE	SN	Comments
Abalone	Yes	Yes	Yes	Yes	Yes	Yes	Yes	Yes	No	Yes	Yes	Yes	Yes	No				Biomolecular graphics environment: macromolecule builders, GPU accelerated MD
AlvaBuilder	No	No	No	No	No	No	No	No	No	No	No	No	No	Yes	Yes			Software for de novo molecular design using Genetic algorithm to build and optimise molecules
AMBER	No	No	No	Yes	Yes	No	No	Yes	No	Yes	Yes	No	Yes	No		Yes		Classical molecular modeling program
Ascalaph Designer	Yes	Yes	Yes	Yes	Yes	Yes	Yes	Yes	No	Yes	Yes	Yes	Yes	No				Common molecular modeling suite
BOSS	No	No	No	No	No	No	No	Yes	No	Yes	Yes	Yes	Yes	No				OPLS inventor
Discovery Studio	Yes	Yes	Yes	Yes	Yes	Yes	Yes	Yes	Yes	Yes	Yes	Yes	Yes	Yes				Molecule modeling environment for both small and macro molecular systems
DOCK	No	No	No	No	No	No	No	Yes	Yes	Yes	Yes	No	No	No				DOCK algorithm
Firefly (PC GAMESS)	No	No	No	No	No	No	No	Yes	No	Yes	No	Yes	Yes	No				Ab initio and DFT computational chemistry program
FoldX	No	No	No	No	No	No	No	Yes	No	Yes	Yes	No	Yes	No				A force field for energy calculations and protein design
Lead Finder	No	No	No	No	No	No	No	Yes	Yes	No	Yes	No	No	No				Molecular docking package
Materials Studio	Yes	Yes	Yes	No	No	Yes	Yes	Yes	Yes	Yes	Yes	Yes	Yes	No				Software environment
Molecular Operating Environment (MOE)	Yes	Yes	Yes	Yes	Yes	Yes	Yes	Yes	Yes	Yes	Yes	Yes	Yes	Yes	Yes			Platform for molecular modelling / drug discovery applications, programmed in Scientific Vector Language to enable application customisation and development
Rosetta (RosettaCommons)	No	No	Yes	Yes	Yes	Yes	Yes	Yes	Yes	Yes	Yes	No	Yes	No				A suite for macromolecule modeling. Algorithms for modeling and analysis of protein structures. Key advances in de novo protein design, enzyme design, ligand docking, structure prediction
SAMSON	Yes	Yes	Yes	No	No	Yes	Yes	No	Yes	Yes	Yes	Yes	Yes	No				Computational nanoscience (life sciences, materials, etc.); modular architecture, modules are termed Elements; free
Scigress	Yes	Yes	Yes	No	Yes	Yes	Yes	Yes	Yes	Yes	Yes	Yes	Yes	Yes				General purpose molecular modeling suite
Spartan	Yes	Yes	No	Yes	Yes	No	Yes	Yes	No	Yes	Yes	Yes	No	No				Molecular modeling tool with molecular mechanics and quantum chemical engines
Tinker	No	No	No	No	Yes	No	No	Yes	No	Yes	Yes	No	No	No				Tools for protein design; freeware
Winmostar	Yes	Yes	Yes	No	No	Yes	Yes	Yes	No	Yes	Yes	Yes	Yes	No				Molecular modeling and visualizing program for materials science
Schrödinger	Yes	Yes	Yes	Yes	Yes	Yes	Yes	Yes	Yes	Yes	Yes	Yes	Yes	Yes	Yes	Yes		Molecular modeling platform for both life and materials science

== See also ==
- Molecule editor
- Molecular modelling
- Molecular modeling on GPUs
- Protein design
- Drug design
- Force field (chemistry)
- Comparison of force field implementations
- Comparison of nucleic acid simulation software
- Comparison of software for molecular mechanics modeling
- List of molecular graphics systems
- List of software for Monte Carlo molecular modeling
- List of software for nanostructures modeling
- Quantum chemistry computer programs
- Quantitative structure-activity relationship
- XMD, a classical molecular dynamics software
