= ETOX =

Toxicology data consortium

eTOX
- Part of the Innovative Medicines Initiative
- Keywords: Drug discovery, drug development
- Project type: Joint Technology Initiative
- Funding agency: Seventh Framework Programme; European Federation of Pharmaceutical Industries and Associations (EFPIA)
- Objective: Develop in silico strategies and software tools to predict the toxicological profiles of small molecules
- Project coordinator: Novartis, Bayer
- Participants: EFPIA: AstraZeneca, Boehringer Ingelheim, Esteve, GlaxoSmithKline, Janssen Pharmaceutica, Lundbeck, Pfizer, Hoffmann-La Roche, UCB, Sanofi, Servier Academia: Erasmus Universitair Medisch Centrum, Fraunhofer Gesellschaft, Fundació Institut Mar d'Investigacions Mèdiques, Fundación Centro Nacional de Investigaciones Oncológicas Carlos III, European Molecular Biology Laboratory, Liverpool John Moores University, Technical University of Denmark, Universitat Politècnica de Valencia, University of Leicester, Universität Wien, VU University Amsterdam SME: Lhasa Limited, Inte:Ligand, Molecular Networks, Chemotargets, Lead Molecular Design, Synapse Research Management Partners
- Budget: Total: 6.9 million EUR; Funding: 18.7 million EUR
- Duration: 2010 – 2016
- Website: www.e-tox.net

eTOX is a temporary consortium established in 2010 to share and use toxicology data. It is a pre-competitive collaboration which main goal is to create and distribute tools to predict drug side-effects based on pre-clinical experiments. Aims are a better in silico predictability of potential adverse events and a decrease of the use of animals in toxicological research. eTOX is funded by the Innovative Medicines Initiative (IMI).

== Goals ==
The official title of the consortium is "Integrating bioinformatics and chemoinformatics approaches for the development of expert systems allowing the in silico prediction of toxicities (eTOX)". eTOX aims at creating in silico tools to predict the toxicity of small molecules during early stages of the drug development pipeline. The consortium is assembling predictive model based on a set of toxicology reports curated by pharmaceutical companies who joined the consortium. In the spirit of the IMI, eTOX bring together private companies producing preclinical data and academic partners experts on cheminformatics, bioinformatics and natural language processing. Contribution to public domain of algorithms, software and ontologies is part of the road-map.

== Organization ==
To achieve these goal, a consortium bringing together 25 pharmaceutical companies, biotech companies and university was created. The project was started in 2010, it was originally funded for 5 years by consortium partners and the European Union. The consortium did benefit from an ENSO extension and will continue until end of 2016. Overall estimated budget is 18.7 million Euros.

== Partners ==
eTOX is collaborating with OpenPHACTS, another IMI consortium to reuse publicly available clinical data. In 2014, the IMI iPiE (Intelligence-Led Assessment of Pharmaceuticals in the Environment) consortium was started, goals are similar to eTOX, but raw data are from chemical substances collected to comply with REACH European regulation. It was agreed that a close collaboration for database development, predictive systems and intellectual property issues will take place.

== Outcome and dissemination ==
The eTox project is currently running and is scheduled to finish in December 2016. Internal work is slowly becoming visible externally: as of August 2014, 3046 reports from 4291 animal studies were manually curated and stored in a database. Two thousand more are being processed, and seventy-four models were built and validated, mostly based on public data. The consortium has started to disseminate information and a review article about the project has been published.

The list of scientific publications (including articles and talks) is accessible at the eTOX public website.

An external newsletter is released every 3 months with the main advances in the project, since November 2011.

== The future ==
The United States Food and Drug Administration is going to ask for electronic submission of raw data from animal studies using the Standard for Exchange of Non-clinical Data in future investigational new drug and biologic license application submissions. This is widely seen as a potential game changer for the toxicology discipline where data exchange and data mining of large data-sets is not the norm. It could allow for the automatic import to a database like the eTOX one.

== See also ==
- Framework Programmes for Research and Technological Development
- Seventh Framework Programme
