= Khimera =

Software product from Kintech Lab

Khimera is a software product from Kintech Lab intended for calculation of the kinetic parameters of microscopic processes, thermodynamic and transport properties of substances and their mixtures in gases, plasmas and also of heterogeneous processes.

The development of a kinetic mechanism is a key stage of present-day technologies for the creation of hi-tech devices and processes in a wide range of fields, such as microelectronics, chemical industry, and the design and optimization of combustion engines and power stations.

Khimera with Chemical WorkBench, another software product from Kintech Lab, allows both the development of complex physical and chemical mechanisms and their validation. Essential feature of Khimera is its user-friendly interface for importing and utilizing the results of quantum-chemical calculations for estimating rate constants of elementary processes and thermodynamic and transport properties.

== Basic capabilities ==
The computation modules of Khimera allow one to calculate the kinetic parameters of elementary processes and thermodynamic and transport properties from the data on the molecular structures and properties obtained from quantum-chemical calculations or from an experiment. The molecular properties and the parameters of molecular interactions can be calculated using quantum-chemical software (Gaussian, GAMESS, Jaguar, ADF) and directly imported into Khimera in an automatic mode. The results of calculations can be presented visually and exported for the further use in kinetic modeling and CFD packages.
