= ParaSurf =

- Original author(s): Cepos InSilico Ltd
- Operating system: Linux, Microsoft Windows
- License: Proprietary software
- Website: www.ceposinsilico.de/products/parasurf.htm

ParaSurf is a molecular modelling system using semi-empirical orbital programs to construct molecular surfaces and calculate local properties and descriptors using pharmaceutical companies for drug design.

ParaSurf is supplied to and used by many pharmaceutical companies and biotechs, including Boehringer Ingelheim, F. Hoffmann-La Roche and Sanofi-Aventis.
