= List of software for nanostructures modeling =

Three dimensional molecular model of an all-carbon tubular fullerene.

This is a list of notable computer programs that are used to model nanostructures at the levels of classical mechanics and quantum mechanics.

- Furiousatoms - a powerful software for molecular modelling and visualization
- Aionics.io - a powerful platform for nanoscale modelling
- Ascalaph Designer
- Atomistix ToolKit and Virtual NanoLab
- CoNTub
- CP2K
- CST Studio Suite
- Deneb – graphical user interface (GUI) for SIESTA, VASP, QE, etc., DFT calculation packages
- Enalos Cloud Platform – a cloud platform containing tools for the digital construction of energy minimized nanotubes and ellipsoidal nanoparticles and the calculation of their atomistic descriptors.
- Exabyte.io - a cloud-native integrated platform for nanoscale modeling, supporting simulations at multiple scales, including Density Functional Theory and Molecular Dynamics
- JCMsuite – a finite element analysis software for simulating optical properties of nanostructures
- LAMMPS – Open source molecular dynamics code
- MAPS - Graphical user interface to build complex systems (nanostructures, polymers, surfaces...), set up and analyze ab-initio (Quantum Espresso, VASP, Abinit, NWChem...) or classical (LAMMPS, Towhee) simulations
- Nanoengineer-1 – developed by company Nanorex, but the website doesn't work, may be unavailable
- nanoHUB allows simulating geometry, electronic properties and electrical transport phenomena in various nanostructures
- Nanotube Modeler
- NEMO 3-D – enables multi-million atom electronic structure simulations in empirical tight binding; open source; an educational version is on nanoHUB and Quantum Dot Lab
- nextnano allows simulating geometry, electronic properties and electrical transport phenomena in various nanostructures using continuum models (commercial software)
- Ninithi – carbon nanotube, graphene, and Fullerene modelling software
- Materials Design MedeA
- Materials Studio
- Materials Square - a cloud-based materials simulation web platform, provides GUI for Quantum Espresso, LAMMPS, and Open Calphad
- MBN Explorer and MBN Studio
- MD-kMC
- PARCAS – Open source molecular dynamics code
- SAMSON: interactive carbon nanotube modeling and simulation
- Scigress
- TubeASP
- Tubegen
- Wrapping

== See also ==
- List of quantum chemistry and solid state physics software
- Comparison of software for molecular mechanics modeling
- Comparison of nucleic acid simulation software
- Molecular design software
- Molecule editor
- Carbon nanotube
- Boron nitride nanotube
- Graphene
