= LigandScout =

- Developer(s): Inte:Ligand GmbH
- Initial release: 2005; 20 years ago
- Stable release: 4.4.3 / January 21, 2020; 5 years ago
- Operating system: Windows, Mac OS X, Linux
- Platform: x86, x86-64
- Available in: English
- Type: Molecular modelling and design
- License: Proprietary commercial software
- Website: www.inteligand.com/ligandscout

LigandScout is computer software that allows creating three-dimensional (3D) pharmacophore models from structural data of macromolecule–ligand complexes, or from training and test sets of organic molecules. It incorporates a complete definition of 3D chemical features (such as hydrogen bond donors, acceptors, lipophilic areas, positively and negatively ionizable chemical groups) that describe the interaction of a bound small organic molecule (ligand) and the surrounding binding site of the macromolecule. These pharmacophores can be overlaid and superimposed using a pattern-matching based alignment algorithm that is solely based on pharmacophoric feature points instead of chemical structure. From such an overlay, shared features can be interpolated to create a so-called shared-feature pharmacophore that shares all common interactions of several binding sites/ligands or extended to create a so-called merged-feature pharmacophore. The software has been successfully used to predict new lead structures in drug design, e.g., predicting biological activity of novel human immunodeficiency virus (HIV) reverse transcriptase inhibitors.

== Similar tools ==
Other software tools which help to model pharmacophores include:

- Molecular Operating Environment] (MOE) – by the Chemical Computing Group
- Phase – by Schrödinger
- Discovery Studio – by Accelrys
- SYBYL-X – by Tripos
- Pharao by Silicos-It

== See also ==
- Comparison of software for molecular mechanics modeling
