= EzMol =

- EzMol
- Original author: Dr. Christopher Reynolds
- Developer: Imperial College London
- Initial release: January 2018; 8 years ago
- Stable release: 1.20 / March 2018; 8 years ago
- Written in: Perl, JavaScript
- Operating system: Windows XP+, Linux, Mac OS X
- Available in: English
- Type: Computational chemistry
- License: Proprietary commercial software
- Website: EzMol

Ezmol, stylized EzMol, is a web server for molecular modelling.

== About ==
Ezmol is a molecular modeling web server for the visualisation of protein molecules. It has a limited selection of visualisation options for the most common requirements of molecular visualisation, enabling the rapid production of images through a wizard-style interface, without the use of command-line syntax. It is developed and maintained by Professor Michael Sternberg's group at The Centre for Integrative Systems Biology and Bioinformatics, Imperial College London and was published in the Journal of Molecular Biology in 2018.
