= XMD =

Classical molecular dynamics software

XMD is a classical molecular dynamics software designed to simulate problems related to materials science. The code was developed by Jon Rifkin of University of Connecticut and is being distributed under GNU General Public License.

Source code is available in C and can be compiled using POSIX thread functions to take advantage of multi-CPU computers.

== See also ==
- Molecular design software
