= Glide (docking) =

Molecular modeling software

- Developer(s): Schrödinger, Inc.
- Initial release: 2004; 21 years ago
- Stable release: Schrödinger Release 2023-1 / 2023; 2 years ago
- Written in: C, Python
- Operating system: Linux, Mac OS X, and Microsoft Windows
- Platform: Many
- Available in: English
- Type: Protein–ligand docking
- License: Proprietary software
- Website: www.schrodinger.com/products/glide

Glide is a molecular modeling software for docking of small molecules into proteins and other biopolymers. It was developed by Schrödinger, Inc.
