= Scientific Vector Language =

Software company in Canada

SVL
- Paradigm: Multi-paradigm
- First appeared: 1994
- Typing discipline: Dynamic
- OS: Cross-platform
- License: Proprietary software
- Website: http://www.chemcomp.com/

SVL or Scientific Vector Language is a programming language created by Chemical Computing Group. It was first released in 1994. SVL is the built-in command, scripting and application development language of MOE. It is a "chemistry aware" computer programming language with over 1,000 specific functions for analyzing and manipulating chemical structures and related molecular objects. SVL is a concise, high-level language whose programs are typically 10 times smaller than their equivalent when compared to C or Fortran. SVL source code is compiled to a "byte code" representation, which is then executed by the base run-time environment making SVL programs inherently portable across different computer hardware and operating systems.
