= Inte:Ligand =

Inte:Ligand GmbH
- Type: Private
- Industry: Life sciences
- Founded: 2003
- Headquarters: Vienna, Austria
- Area served: Worldwide
- Key people: Thierry Langer (Founder) Gerhard Wolber (Founder) Hermann Stuppner (Founder) Sharon D. Bryant (CEO)
- Products: LigandScout Essential LigandScout Advanced LigandScout Expert KNIME iLib:Diverse PharmacophoreDB
- Services: Contract Research, In-Silico Library Design, Lead Optimization Support, Virtual Screening, Activity Profiling, 3D-Pharmacophore Development, Scientific Software Development
- Website: www.inteligand.com

Inte:Ligand was founded in Maria Enzersdorf, Lower Austria (Niederösterreich) in 2003. They established the company headquarters on Mariahilferstrasse in Vienna, Austria that same year.

In 2007 Inte:Ligand was the recipient of the NÖ Innovation prize (Innovationpreis) for the development of the simulation software LigandScout. As of 2017 there were more than 1500 literature, book chapters and review articles published related to InteLigand software technology in the areas of virtual screening, 3D-pharmacophore modeling, hit identification, medicinal chemistry decision support, activity profiling, docking, fragment-based compound design, protein-protein-interactions, drug-repurposing and molecular dynamics simulations.

Other applications include the discovery of new Myeloperoxidase ligands, HIV reverse transcriptase inhibitors, applications in anti-viral bio-activity profiling, the development of models to predict HIV Protease activity, Cytochrome P450 activity prediction , and simulation models for the activity on Factor Xa.

== Science and Technology ==
- LigandScout Essential, is a scientific software program for de novo molecule design, to derive structure-based and ligand-based 3D pharmacophores, perform molecular 3D alignments, 3D pharmacophore modeling, virtual screening, create multi-conformational compound libraries for virtual screening, annotate compound libraries and perform filtering and sorting and advanced pharmacophore and molecule editing.
- LigandScout Advanced, is a scientific software program that has all of the functionality of LigandScout Essential plus docking, Apo site pharmacophore modeling, pocket finding, analysis of molecular dynamics trajectories.
- LigandScout Expert KNIME Extensions provide more than 45 Inte:Ligand scientific algorithms wrapped into KNIME extensions to be used for designing customized workflows related to computer aided drug design using the platform KNIME.
