= Molecular Modelling Toolkit =

MMTK
- Original author: Konrad Hinsen
- Initial release: 4 January 2000; 26 years ago
- Stable release: 2.7.4 / 28 April 2011; 14 years ago
- Written in: Python, C
- Operating system: Cross-platform
- Type: Bioinformatics
- Website: dirac.cnrs-orleans.fr/MMTK/

The Molecular Modelling Toolkit (MMTK) is an open-source software package written in Python, which performs common tasks in molecular modelling.

The Molecular Modeling Toolkit is a library that implements common molecular simulation techniques, with an emphasis on biomolecular simulations. It uses modern software engineering techniques (object-oriented design, a high-level language) in order to overcome limitations associated with the large monolithic simulation programs that are commonly used for biomolecules. Its principal advantages are (1) easy extension and combination with other libraries due to modular library design, (2) a single high-level general-purpose programming language (Python) is used for library implementation as well as for application scripts, (3) use of documented and machine-independent formats for all data files, and (4) interfaces to other simulation and visualization programs.

— Konrad Hinsen, The Molecular Modeling Toolkit: A New Approach to Molecular Simulations

As of 28 April 2011, MMTK consists of about 18,000 lines of Python code, 12,000 lines of hand-written C code, and some machine-generated C code.

== Features ==
- construction of molecular systems, with special support for proteins and nucleic acids
- infinite systems or periodic boundary conditions (orthorhombic elementary cells)
- common geometrical operations on coordinates
- rigid-body fits
- visualization using external PDB and VRML viewers; animation of dynamics trajectories and normal modes
- the AMBER 94 force field, with several options for handling electrostatic interactions
- a deformation force field for fast normal mode calculations on proteins
- energy minimization (steepest descent and conjugate gradient)
- molecular dynamics (with optional thermostat, barostat, and distance constraints)
- normal mode analysis
- trajectory operations
- point charge fits
- molecular surface calculations
- interfaces to other programs

== See also ==
- Software for molecular mechanics modelling
