= Reaction Design =

Combustion simulation software developer

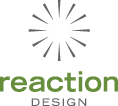
- Type: Privately held company
- Founded: 1997; 29 years ago
- Headquarters: San Diego, California
- Key people: Bernie Rosenthal, CEO; Ellen Meeks, VP Technology; Albert Hugo-Martinez, Chairman
- Products: FORTÉ; ENERGICO; CHEMKIN; MODEL FUEL LIBRARY; CHEMKIN-CFD
- Number of employees: < 50
- Website: reactiondesign.com

Reaction Design is a San Diego–based developer of combustion simulation software used by engineers to design cleaner burning and fuel-efficient combustors and engines, found in everything from automobiles to turbines for power generation and aircraft propulsion to large diesel engines that use pistons the size of rooms to propel ships locomotives. The technology is also used to model spray vaporization in electronic materials processing applications and predict mixing reactions in chemical plants. Ansys, a leader in engineering simulation software, acquired Reaction Design in January 2014.

== History ==
Reaction Design was founded in 1997 by David H. Klipstein, formerly senior vice president of technology and marketing at Biosym Technologies (now Accelrys). Reaction Design began with a vision of extending the power of kinetic chemistry simulation to industrial markets, enabling industry to replace costly experimental processes with dynamic and precise software-based simulation.

That same year, Reaction Design became the exclusive developer and licensee of Chemkin, originally created by Sandia National Laboratories in Livermore, California, for modeling gas-phase and surface chemistry. Ellen Meeks, a principal developer of Chemkin, was hired to lead technology development.

In 2005 the company hired Bernie Rosenthal as its CEO.

In April 2008, Reaction Design introduced Chemkin-Pro for modeling and analyzing combustion efficiency in gasoline, diesel and emerging alternative fuel engines. Energico was announced in October 2008 as a simulation software package for the gas turbine industry.

On January 3, 2014, Reaction Design was acquired by Ansys.

== Model Fuels Consortium ==
Reaction Design developed the Model Fuels Consortium in 2005 to address the emerging challenges experienced by the automotive and fuel industry. The consortium was composed of energy companies, engine manufacturers and academic advisors. Its goal was to enable the design of cleaner burning, more efficient engines and fuels by accelerating the development of software tools and databases. It expanded in 2007.

Members included Chevron, Dow Chemical Company, L'Institut Français du Pétrole, Mitsubishi Motors, Nissan, PSA Peugeot Citroën, and Toyota, and academic advisors Chief Technical Advisor Charlie Westbrook,. Anthony Dean from Colorado School of Mines (formerly of Exxon), William Green from MIT, Mitsuo Koshi from University of Tokyo, Ulrich Maas from Karlsruhe University, and Hiromitsu Ando from Fukui University, formerly chief executive scientist of Mitsubishi Motors. Charter members were later joined by ConocoPhillips, Cummins Engine Company, Ford Motor Company, GE Energy, Honda, Mazda, General Motors, Oak Ridge National Laboratory, Petrobras, Saudi Aramco, Suzuki and Volkswagen.

The consortium concluded in November 2012.

== Products ==
Forté is a computational fluid dynamics package that enables multi-component surrogate fuel models to work with comprehensive spray fluid dynamics.

Energico is a complex system-design simulation tool for solving gas-turbine engineering problems related to emissions reduction and stability.

Chemkin is a simulation tool for basic chemical kinetics simulations that use small or reduced reaction mechanism. The initial version was published in 1980, and expanded with Chemkin-II published in 1989. It was written in the FORTRAN programming language. Chemkin III was published in 1996 by Sandia.

Other versions include Chemkin-Pro for large chemical simulation applications requiring complex mechanisms. Chemkin-Pro is designed for chemical kinetics simulations requiring complex reaction mechanisms. Reaction Workbench is an extension to Chemkin-Pro that offers fuel formulation and automated mechanism-reduction capabilities specifically created for fuel-combustion engineers and scientists.

Model Fuel Library is a subscription-based library to simulate fuel effects in automotive and aircraft engines, as well as engines used for electric power generation.

Chemkin-CFD is a plug-in chemistry solver that can be linked to other computational software packages, such as Ansys’ Fluent CFD software, to add accuracy, speed and stability to calculations using finite-rate, multi-step reaction kinetics.
