= FoldX =

Protein design algorithm

FoldX is a protein design algorithm that uses an empirical force field. It can determine the energetic effect of point mutations as well as the interaction energy of protein complexes (including Protein-DNA). FoldX can mutate protein and DNA side chains using a probability-based rotamer library, while exploring alternative conformations of the surrounding side chains.

== Applications ==
- Prediction of the effect of point mutations or human SNPs on protein stability or protein complexes
- Protein design to improve stability or modify affinity or specificity
- Homology modeling

== The FoldX force field ==
The energy function includes terms that have been found to be important for protein stability, where the energy of unfolding (∆G) of a target protein is calculated using the equation:

∆G = ∆G_{vdw} + ∆G_{solvH} + ∆G_{solvP} + ∆G_{hbond} + ∆G_{wb} + ∆G_{el} + ∆S_{mc} + ∆S_{sc}

Where ∆G_{vdw} is the sum of the Van der Waals contributions of all atoms with respect to the same interactions with the solvent. ∆G_{solvH} and ∆G_{solvP} is the difference in solvation energy for apolar and polar groups, respectively, when going from the unfolded to the folded state. ∆Ghbond is the free energy difference between the formation of an intra-molecular hydrogen-bond compared to inter-molecular hydrogen-bond formation (with solvent). ∆G_{wb} is the extra stabilizing free energy provided by a water molecule making more than one hydrogen-bond to the protein (water bridges) that cannot be taken into account with non-explicit solvent approximations. ∆G_{el} is the electrostatic contribution of charged groups, including the helix dipole. ∆S_{mc} is the entropy cost for fixing the backbone in the folded state. This term is dependent on the intrinsic tendency of a particular amino acid to adopt certain dihedral angles. ∆S_{sc} is the entropic cost of fixing a side chain in a particular conformation. The energy values of ∆G_{vdw}, ∆G_{solvH}, ∆G_{solvP} and ∆G_{hbond} attributed to each atom type have been derived from a set of experimental data, and ∆S_{mc} and ∆S_{sc} have been taken from theoretical estimates. The Van der Waals contributions are derived from vapor to water energy transfer, while in the protein we are going from solvent to protein.

For protein-protein interactions, or protein-DNA interactions FoldX calculates ∆∆G of interaction :

∆∆G_{ab} = ∆G_{ab}- (∆G_{a} + ∆G_{b}) + ∆G_{kon} + ∆S_{sc}

∆G_{kon} reflects the effect of electrostatic interactions on the k_{on}. ∆S_{sc} is the loss of translational and rotational entropy upon making the complex.

== Key features ==
- RepairPDB: energy minimization of a protein structure
- BuildModel: in silico mutagenesis or homology modeling with predicted energy changes
- AnalyseComplex: interaction energy calculation
- Stability: prediction of free energy changes between alternative structures
- AlaScan: in silico alanine scan of a protein structure with predicted energy changes
- SequenceDetail: per residue free energy decomposition into separate energy terms (hydrogen bonding, Van der Waals energy, electrostatics, ...)

== Graphical interface ==
Native FoldX is run from the command line. A FoldX plugin for the YASARA molecular graphics program has been developed to access various FoldX tools inside a graphical environment. The results of e.g. in silico mutations or homology modeling with FoldX can be directly analyzed on screen.

== Molecule Parametrization ==
In version 5.0, the possibility to parametrize previously not recognized molecules in JSON format was added into the software.
