= Potential function =

The term potential function may refer to:

- A mathematical function, whose values are given by a scalar potential or vector potential
- The electric potential, in the context of electrodynamics, is formally described by both a scalar electrostatic potential and a magnetic vector potential
- The class of functions known as harmonic functions, which are the topic of study in potential theory
- The potential function of a potential game
- In the potential method of amortized analysis, a function describing an investment of resources by past operations that can be used by future operations
