= Kinetic PreProcessor =

KPP
- Developer(s): Adrian Sandu; Rolf Sander; Michael Long; Haipeng Lin; Robert Yantosca
- Stable release: 3.3.0 / July 2025
- Operating system: Cross-platform
- Type: Technical computing
- License: GPL

The Kinetic PreProcessor (KPP) is an open-source software tool used in atmospheric chemistry. Taking a set of chemical reactions and their rate coefficients as input, KPP generates Fortran 90, FORTRAN 77, C, or Matlab code of the resulting ordinary differential equations (ODEs). Solving the ODEs allows the temporal integration of the kinetic system. Efficiency is obtained by exploiting the sparsity structures of the Jacobian and of the Hessian. A comprehensive suite of stiff numerical integrators is also provided. Moreover, KPP can be used to generate the tangent linear model, as well as the continuous and discrete adjoint models of the chemical system.

== Models using KPP ==
Model	Description
BASCOE	A data assimilation system based on a chemical transport model and created by the Belgian Institute for Space Aeronomy (BIRA-IASB)
Boream	Model for the degradation of alpha-pinene
BOXMOX	Box model extensions to KPP
CMAQ	Community Multiscale Air Quality model
DSMACC	Dynamically Simple Model of Atmospheric Chemical Complexity
GEOS-Chem	Global 3-D chemical transport model for atmospheric composition
KPP-Standalone	A standalone implementation of KPP used to test and debug GEOS-Chem, GCHP, or GEOS-CF mechanisms.
MALTE	Model to predict new aerosol formation in the lower troposphere
MCM	Master Chemical Mechanism
MECCA	Module Efficiently Calculating the Chemistry of the Atmosphere
Mistra	Microphysical Stratus model
PACT-1D	Platform for Atmospheric Chemistry and vertical Transport in 1-dimension
PALM	Meteorological modeling system for atmospheric and oceanic boundary layer flows
RACM	Regional Atmospheric Chemistry Mechanism gas-phase chemistry mechanism
WRF-Chem	Weather Research & Forecasting Model with Chemistry

== See also ==
- Chemical kinetics
- Autochem
- CHEMKIN
- Cantera
- Chemical WorkBench
