= MBN Explorer =

Chemistry simulation software

MesoBioNano Explorer
- Developer(s): MBN Research Center
- Initial release: 2012; 13 years ago
- Stable release: 3.0 / March 31, 2017; 7 years ago
- Written in: C++
- Operating system: Cross-platform: Windows, Linux, macOS
- Platform: x86, x86-64
- Available in: English
- Type: Molecular dynamics, kinetic Monte Carlo simulations
- License: Proprietary; free trial
- Website: www.mbnexplorer.com

MBN Explorer (MesoBioNano Explorer) is a software package for molecular dynamics simulations, structure optimization and kinetic Monte Carlo simulations. It is designed for multiscale computational analysis of structure and dynamics of atomic clusters and nanoparticles, biomolecules and nanosystems, nanostructured materials, different states of matter and various interfaces. The software has been developed by MBN Research Center.

== History ==
MBN Explorer inherited the experience obtained on the development of the software package Cluster Searcher. It started around 2000 as a classical molecular dynamics code for simulating many-body systems interacting via the Morse and the Lennard-Jones potentials. A variety of interatomic potentials and the possibility to combine a group of atoms into rigid blocks were introduced in 2005–2007. The first version of MBN Explorer was released in 2012 as a multipurpose computer code allowing to model different molecular systems of varied level of complexity.

== Features ==
MBN Explorer allows for the multiscale description of molecular systems by means of kinetic Monte Carlo approach and the irradiation-driven molecular dynamics. By means of the Monte Carlo approach, the software allows to simulate diffusion-drive processes involving molecular systems on much larger time scales that can be reached in conventional molecular dynamics simulations. The software allows to combine different types of interatomic potentials to specify more than one interaction to a particular atom or a group of atoms.

MBN Explorer supports several standard atomic trajectory formats, such as XYZ (text format), DCD (binary format) and DCD+XYZ (hybrid format). It also supports the Protein Data Bank (pdb) file format for describing the three-dimensional structures of biomolecules.

Advanced features of the program include:

- flexible coarse graining and the possibility to simulate dynamics of rigid bodies,
- the possibility to perform relativistic molecular dynamics simulations of ultra-relativistic particles in crystalline media,
- simulation of irradiation-induced chemical transformations by means of irradiation-driven molecular dynamics.

== MBN Studio ==
MBN Explorer is complemented with MBN Studio - a multi-task program for molecular modeling and design, as well as for visualization and analysis of results of the simulations performed with MBN Explorer. The built-in molecular modeler can be used to construct isolated and solvated biomolecules, condensed molecular materials, carbon nanotubes and graphene sheets, nanoparticles and crystalline samples.

== Projects and collaborations ==
MBN Explorer has been utilized in different research projects in the fields of materials science, nanotechnology and radiation damage:

- ARGENT - Advanced Radiotherapy, Generated by Exploiting Nanoprocesses and Technologies
  This is a multidisciplinary network project involving different research groups, academic and industrial partners. It is financed by the Seventh Framework Programme (FP7) of the EU.
- PEARL - Periodically Bent Crystals for Crystalline Undulators
  This is an international project supported by the Horizon 2020 Programme (H2020) of the EU.
- Nano-IBCT - Nanoscale Insights into Ion-Beam Cancer Therapy
- VINAT - Theoretical analysis, design and virtual testing of biocompatibility and mechanical properties of titanium-based nanomaterials

== See also ==
- Comparison of software for molecular mechanics modeling
- List of software for nanostructures modeling
- NAMD
- GROMACS
- LAMMPS
