= AIMAll =

Quantum chemistry software package

AIMAll is a multiplatform, quantum chemistry software package whose primary purpose is to perform quantitative and visual Atoms in Molecules (AIM) analyses. It requires molecular wave function files as input, typically generated from ab initio or density functional theory (DFT) calculations. AIMAll is used and cited in numerous peer-reviewed research articles.

As of 2019, the most recent release was version 19.10.12.
