= Molecular Playground =

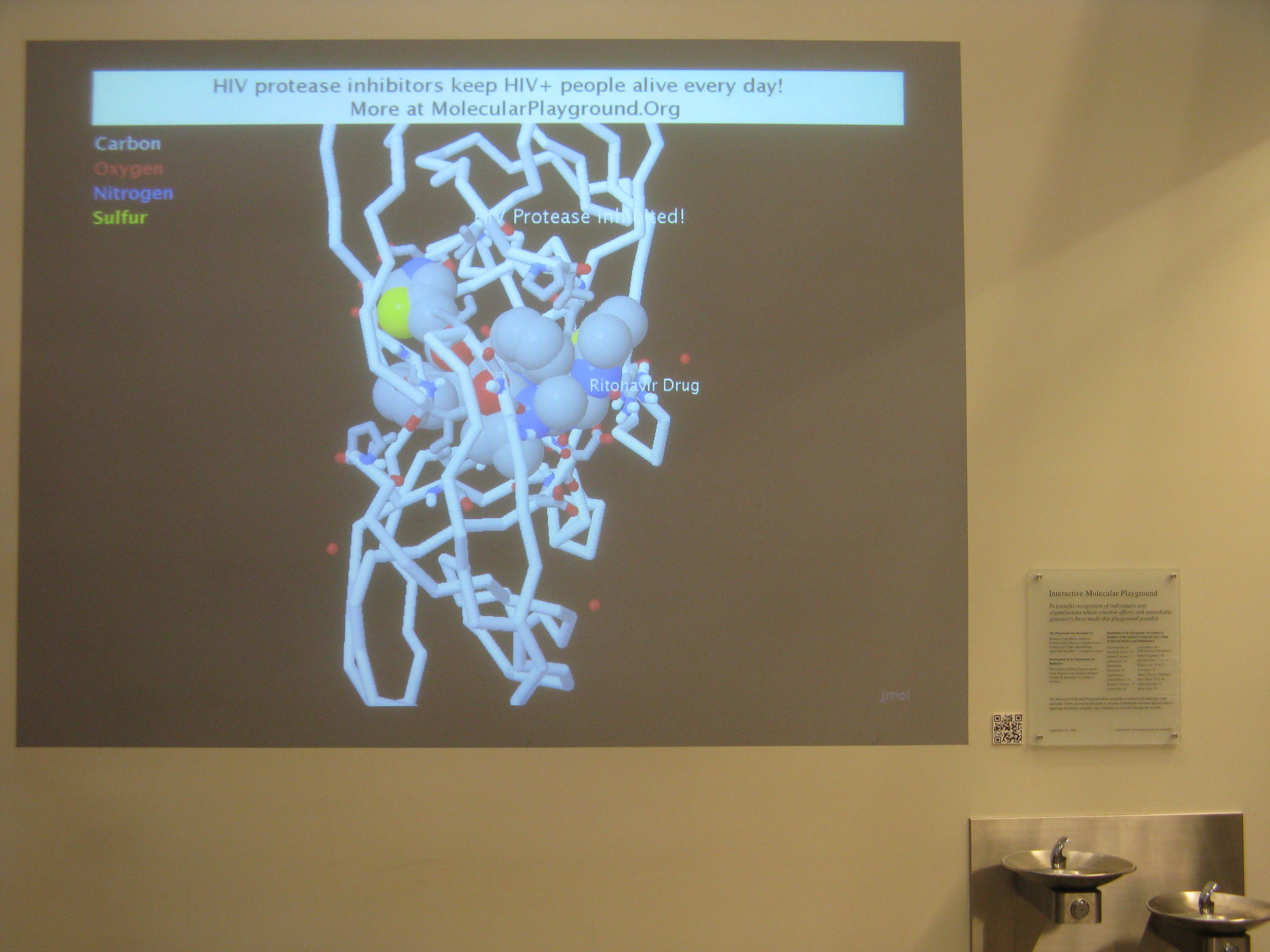
Molecular Playground displaying how Ritonavir binds to HIV-1 protease

Molecular Playground is a project initiated in 2009 by researchers at University of Massachusetts Amherst whose goal is to expose the molecular aspect of nature to the public by the use of a system which displays interactive molecule simulations in public areas.

The exhibits have been displayed at University of Massachusetts, Springfield Science Museum, St Olaf College in Minnesota, Okinawa Institute of Technology in Japan, Gilead Sciences offices, University of Alcalá School of Pharmacy in Spain, Eastern Kentucky University, and Université de Perpignan Via Domitia in France.
