= COSILAB =

COSILAB is a software tool for solving complex chemical kinetics problems. It is used worldwide in research and industry, in particular in automotive, combustion, and chemical processing applications.

Problems to be solved by COSILAB may involve thousands of reactions amongst hundreds of species for practically any mixture composition, pressure and temperature. Its computational capabilities allow for a complex chemical reaction to be studied in detail, including intermediate compounds, trace compounds and pollutants.

Whilst complex chemistry is accounted for, chemical reactor or combustion geometries that can be handled by COSILAB are relatively simple. For the purpose of "real-life" simulations this limitation can be overcome, however, by using a library of pre-compiled subroutines and functions, that one can link to their own code written in Fortran, the C programming language or C++. In this way, it is possible to develop fully two-dimensional or three-dimensional CFD or computational fluid dynamics codes that are able to capture fairly realistic geometries.

The development of codes like COSILAB is motivated by a worldwide attempt to keep the environment clean and to save—or at least make best use of—the continuously diminishing fossil fuel resources.
