= Scigress =

Software for molecular modelling

- Scigress
- Developer(s): Fujitsu Limited
- Stable release: 2.9(3.4.4) / February 2020; 5 years ago
- Written in: C++, C, Java, Fortran
- Operating system: Windows XP+, Linux, Mac OS X
- Available in: English
- Type: Computational chemistry, simulation software
- License: Proprietary commercial software
- Website: www.fqs.pl/en/chemistry/products/scigress

Scigress, stylised SCiGRESS, is a software suite designed for molecular modeling, computational and experimental chemistry, drug design, and materials science. It is a successor to the Computer Aided Chemistry (CAChe) software and has been used to perform experiments on hazardous or novel biomolecules and proteins in silico.

== Functions and use cases ==
- Molecule editing.
- Theory levels: DFT, semi-empirical, molecular mechanics and dynamics.
- Determination of low energy conformations and thermodynamic properties.
- Calculation and 3D visualization of electronic properties, such as partial charges, orbitals, electron densities, and electrostatic surfaces.
- Analysis of transition states and intrinsic reaction coordinates.
- Infrared, UV, and NMR spectroscopy.
- Study of phase transitions, expansion, crystal defects, compressibility, tensile strength, adsorption, absorption, and thermal conductivity.
- Protein handling and protein-ligand docking.

== See also ==
- Molecular design software
- Comparison of software for molecular mechanics modeling
