= Winmostar =

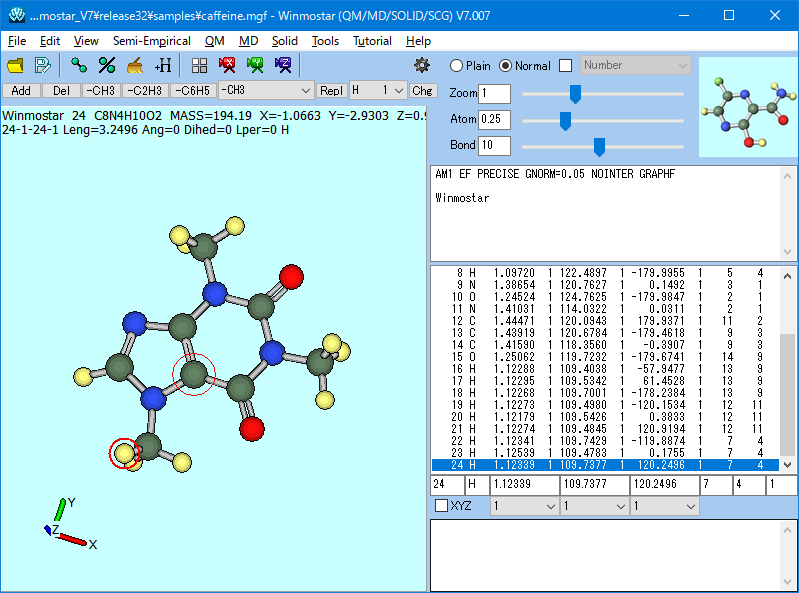
- Developer(s): X-Ability
- Initial release: 2001; 24 years ago
- Stable release: Winmostar V10.07.0 / 2021
- Written in: Delphi, C, C++, Fortran
- Platform: Windows Vista, 7, 8, 10
- Type: molecular modeling、computational chemistry
- License: X-Ability EULA
- Website: Winmostar

Winmostar is a molecular modelling and visualisation software program that computes quantum chemistry, molecular dynamics, and solid physics.

== Development history ==
- 2001 Winmostar V0.40 Windows
- 2008 Winmostar V3.71
- 2012 Winmostar V4.00
- 2014 Winmostar V5.00
- 2015 Winmostar V6.00
- 2016 Winmostar V7.00
- 2017 Winmostar V8.00
- 2019 Winmostar V9.00
- 2020 Winmostar V10.00
