= PLATO (computational chemistry) =

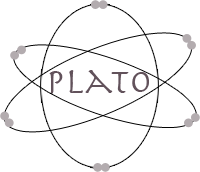
- Operating system: Linux
- License: Specific to this program.

PLATO (Package for Linear-combination of ATomic Orbitals) is a suite of programs for electronic structure calculations. It receives its name from the choice of basis set (atomic orbitals) used to expand the electronic wavefunctions.

PLATO is a code, written in C, for the efficient modelling of materials. It is a tight binding code (both orthogonal and non-orthogonal), allowing for multipole charges and electron spin. It also contains Density Functional Theory programs for building tight binding models. The Density Functional Tight Binding program can be applied to systems with periodic boundary conditions in three dimension (crystals), as well as clusters and molecules.

== How PLATO works ==
How PLATO used to perform Density Functional Theory calculations (no longer available) is summarized in several papers: . A new set of Density Functional Theory programs is being built making use of Gaussian orbital expansions for the basis set (not yet available). The way PLATO performs tight binding simulations is summarized in the following papers:

== Applications of PLATO ==
Some examples of the way it has been used are listed below.

=== Metals ===
- Point defects in transition metals: Density functional theory calculations have been performed to study the systematic trends of point defect behaviours in bee transition metals.

=== Surfaces ===
- Interaction of C_{60} molecules on Si(100):The interactions between pairs of C_{60} molecules adsorbed upon the Si(100) surface have been studied via a series of DFT calculations.

=== Molecules ===
- Efficient local-orbitals based method for ultrafast dynamics: The evolution of electrons in molecules under the influence of time-dependent electric fields is simulated.

== See also ==
- List of quantum chemistry and solid state physics software
