= Arbetstidsförkortning =

Arbetstidsförkortning (ATK; English: shortening of work time ) is additional leave in Sweden, typically 5-10 work days per year. It is not legally mandated, but is available to many employees through collective bargaining agreements.
