= Arachidonyl trifluoromethyl ketone =

Names
- Preferred IUPAC name (6Z,9Z,12Z,15Z)-1,1,1-Trifluorohenicosa-6,9,12,15-teraen-2-one
- Other names: Arachidonic acid trifluoromethyl ketone; Arachidonyltrifluoromethane; Arach-CF3; AACOCF3

Identifiers
CAS Number	149301-79-1
3D model (JSmol)	Interactive image
ChemSpider	4444095
PubChem CID	5280436
UNII	00XIW1CR0F
CompTox Dashboard (EPA)	DTXSID901017144
- InChI: InChI=1S/C21H31F3O/c1-2-3-4-5-6-7-8-9-10-11-12-13-14-15-16-17-18-19-20(25)21(22,23)24/h6-7,9-10,12-13,15-16H,2-5,8,11,14,17-19H2,1H3/b7-6-,10-9-,13-12-,16-15- Key: PLWROONZUDKYKG-DOFZRALJSA-N
- SMILES: CCCCC/C=C\C/C=C\C/C=C\C/C=C\CCCC(=O)C(F)(F)F

Properties
Chemical formula	C_{21}H_{31}F_{3}O
Molar mass	356.473 g·mol^{−1}
- Except where otherwise noted, data are given for materials in their standard state (at 25 °C [77 °F], 100 kPa). Infobox references

Arachidonyl trifluoromethyl ketone (ATK) is an analog of arachidonic acid. that inhibits some isoforms of the enzyme phospholipase A2. Specifically it inhibits the 85 kDa cystolic PLA2 (cPLA2).

It has been studied as a neuroprotective agent after spinal cord injury, and in animal models of multiple sclerosis.

== See also ==
- Spinal stenosis
