= CHEMKIN =

Chemical kinetics software

CHEMKIN is a proprietary software tool for solving complex chemical kinetics problems. It is used worldwide in the combustion, chemical processing, microelectronics and automotive industries, and also in atmospheric science. It was originally developed at Sandia National Laboratories and is now developed by a US company, Reaction Design.

Reaction Design was acquired by ANSYS in 2014 so Chemkin and related products are now available through ANSYS.

== See also ==
- Autochem
- Chemical kinetics
- Cantera
- Chemical WorkBench
- Kinetic PreProcessor (KPP)
