= Atomistix Virtual NanoLab =

Atomistix Virtual NanoLab (VNL) is a commercial point-and-click software for simulation and analysis of physical and chemical properties of nanoscale devices. Virtual NanoLab is developed and sold commercially by QuantumWise A/S. QuantumWise was then acquired by Synopsys in 2017.

== Features ==
With its graphical interface, Virtual NanoLab provides a user-friendly approach to atomic-scale modeling. The software contains a set of interactive instruments that allows the user to design nanosystems, to set up and execute numerical calculations, and to visualize the results. Samples such as molecules, nanotubes, crystalline systems, and two-probe systems (i.e. a nanostructure coupled to two electrodes) are built with a few mouse clicks.

Virtual NanoLab contains a 3D visualization tool, the Nanoscope, where atomic geometries and computed results can be viewed and analyzed. One can for example plot Bloch functions of nanotubes and crystals, molecular orbitals, electron densities, and effective potentials. The numerical engine that carries out the actual simulations is Atomistix ToolKit, which combines density functional theory and non-equilibrium Green's functions to ab initio electronic-structure and transport calculations. Atomistix ToolKit is developed from the academic codes TranSIESTA and McDCal.

== See also ==
- Atomistix ToolKit
- NanoLanguage
- Atomistix
