= OctaDist =

Crystallography and inorganic chemistry software

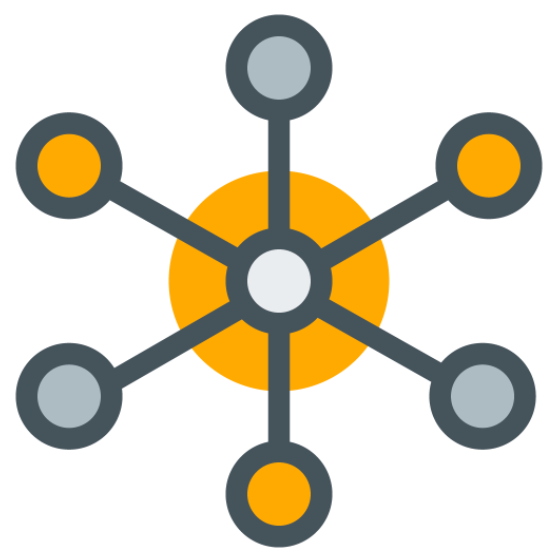
- Developer: Rangsiman Ketkaew
- Initial release: 8 January 2019; 7 years ago
- Stable release: 3.1.0 / 19 March 2024; 2 years ago
- Written in: Python (Tkinter)
- Operating system: Windows, macOS, Linux
- Platform: IA-32, x86-64
- Available in: English
- Type: Crystallography, inorganic chemistry, cheminformatics
- License: GPL 3.0
- Website: octadist.github.io
- Repository: github.com/OctaDist/OctaDist

OctaDist is computer software for crystallography and inorganic chemistry program. It is mainly used for computing distortion parameters of coordination complex such as spin crossover complex (SCO), magnetic metal complex and metal–organic framework (MOF).

The program is developed and maintained in an international collaboration between the members of the Computational Chemistry Research Unit at Thammasat University, the Functional Materials & Nanotechnology CoE at Walailak University and the Switchable Molecules and Materials group at University of Bordeaux.

OctaDist is written entirely in Python binding to Tkinter graphical user interface toolkit. It is available for Windows, macOS, and Linux. It is free and open-source software distributed under a GNU General Public License (GPL) 3.0.

== Standard abilities ==
The following are the main features of the latest version of OctaDist:

- Structural distortion analysis
  - Determination of regular and irregular distorted octahedral molecular geometry
  - Octahedral distortion parameters
  - Volume of the octahedron
  - Tilting distortion parameter for perovskite complex
- Molecular graphics
  - 3D modelling of complex
  - Display of the eight faces of octahedron
  - Atomic orthogonal projection and projection plane
  - Twisting triangular faces
  - Molecular superposition (Overlay)
- Other utilities
  - Scripting language
  - Surface area of the faces of octahedron
  - Jahn–Teller distortion parameters
  - Root-mean-square deviation of atomic positions

== Capabilities ==
- Simple and flexible processes of use
- Cross-platform for both 32-bit and 64-bit systems
- Graphical user interface (GUI)
- Command-line interface (CLI)
- User-friendly interactive scripting code
- User-adjustable program setting
- On top of huge and complicated complexes
- Support for several outputs of computational chemistry software, including Gaussian, Q-Chem, ORCA, and NWChem

== See also ==
- List of quantum chemistry and solid-state physics software
