= CS-ROSETTA =

CS-ROSETTA is a framework for structure calculation of biological macromolecules on the basis of conformational information from NMR, which is built on top of the biomolecular modeling and design software called ROSETTA. The name CS-ROSETTA for this branch of ROSETTA stems from its origin in combining NMR chemical shift (CS) data with ROSETTA structure prediction protocols. The software package was later extended to include additional NMR conformational parameters, such as Residual Dipolar Couplings (RDC), NOE distance restraints, pseudocontact chemical shifts (PCS) and restraints derived from homologous proteins. This software can be used together with other molecular modeling protocols, such as docking to model protein oligomers. In addition, CS-ROSETTA can be combined with chemical shift resonance assignment algorithms to create a fully automated NMR structure determination pipeline. The CS-ROSETTA software is freely available for academic use and can be licensed for commercial use (installation guide). A software manual and tutorials are provided on the supporting website https://csrosetta.chemistry.ucsc.edu/.

The ROSETTA software is written in C++. CS-ROSETTA is distributed together with a toolbox written in Python that facilitates preparation of input files, setting up of large-scale calculations and post-processing of simulation output. CS-ROSETTA calculations require a substantial computational effort and are usually carried out with 200-2000 parallel processes on computer clusters using the Message Passing Interface (MPI) for communication.
