= Autochem =

AutoChem
- Developer(s): David Lary
- Stable release: v8 / 2005
- Operating system: Cross-platform
- Type: Technical computing
- License: Commercial proprietary software
- Website: www.science-softcon.de/autochem/index.html

AutoChem is NASA release software that constitutes an automatic computer code generator and documenter for chemically reactive systems written by David Lary between 1993 and the present. It was designed primarily for modeling atmospheric chemistry, and in particular, for chemical data assimilation.

The user selects a set of chemical species. AutoChem then searches chemical reaction databases for these species and automatically constructs the ordinary differential equations (ODE) that describe the chemical system. AutoChem symbolically differentiates the time derivatives to give the Jacobian matrix, and symbolically differentiates the Jacobian matrix to give the Hessian matrix and the adjoint. The Jacobian matrix is required by many algorithms that solve the ordinary differential equations numerically, particular when the ODEs are stiff. The Hessian matrix and the adjoint are required for four-dimensional variational data assimilation (4D-Var). AutoChem documents the whole process in a set of LaTeX and PDF files.

The reactions involving the user specified constituents are extracted by the first AutoChem preprocessor program called Pick. This subset of reactions is then used by the second AutoChem preprocessor program RoC (rate of change) to generate the time derivatives, Jacobian, and Hessian. Once the two preprocessor programs have run to completion all the Fortran 90 code has been generated that is necessary for modeling and assimilating the kinetic processes.

A huge observational database of many different atmospheric constituents from a host of platforms are available from the AutoChem site.

AutoChem has been used to perform long term chemical data assimilation of atmospheric chemistry. This assimilation was automatically documented by the AutoChem software and is available on line at CDACentral. Data quality is always an issue for chemical data assimilation, in particular the presence of biases. To identify and understand the biases it is useful to compare observations using probability distribution functions. Such an analysis is available on line at PDFCentral which was designed for the validation of observations from the NASA Aura satellite.

== See also ==
- Chemical kinetics
- CHEMKIN
- Cantera
- Chemical WorkBench
- Kinetic PreProcessor (KPP)
- SpeedCHEM
