= Atmospheric chemistry =

Branch of atmospheric science in which the chemistry of the atmosphere is studied

Atmospheric chemistry is a branch of atmospheric science that studies the chemistry of the Earth's atmosphere and that of other planets. This multidisciplinary approach of research draws on environmental chemistry, physics, meteorology, computer modeling, oceanography, geology and volcanology, climatology and other disciplines to understand both natural and human-induced changes in atmospheric composition. Key areas of research include the behavior of trace gasses, the formation of pollutants, and the role of aerosols and greenhouse gasses. Through a combination of observations, laboratory experiments, and computer modeling, atmospheric chemists investigate the causes and consequences of atmospheric changes.

== Atmospheric composition ==
Visualisation of composition by volume of Earth's atmosphere. Water vapour is not included as it is highly variable. Each tiny cube (such as the one representing krypton) has one millionth of the volume of the entire block. Data is from NASA Langley.

The composition of common nitrogen oxides in dry air vs. temperature

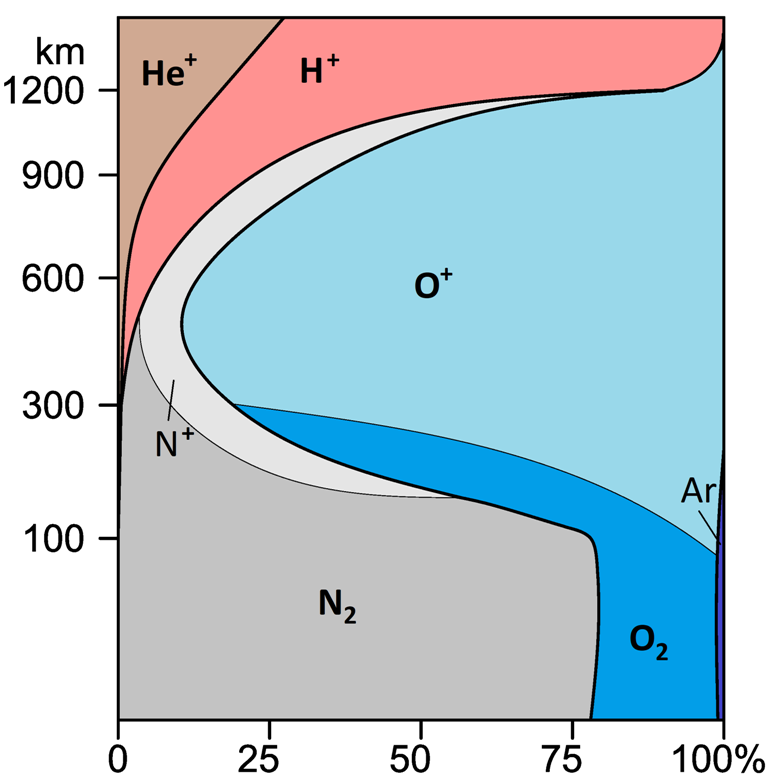
Chemical composition of atmosphere according to altitude. Axis: Altitude (km), Content of volume (%).

The composition and chemistry of the Earth's atmosphere is important for several reasons, but primarily because of the interactions between the atmosphere and living organisms. Natural processes such as volcano emissions, lightning and bombardment by solar particles from corona changes the composition of the Earth's atmosphere. It has also been changed by human activity and some of these changes are harmful to human health, crops and ecosystems.

Average composition of dry atmosphere (mole fractions)
Gas	% (per NASA)
Nitrogen, N_{2}	78.084%
Oxygen, O_{2}	20.946%
Minor constituents (parts per million)
Argon, Ar	9340
Carbon dioxide, CO_{2}	425
Neon, Ne	18.18
Helium, He	5.24
Methane, CH_{4}	1.9
Krypton, Kr	1.14
Sulphur dioxide, SO_{2}	up to 1
Hydrogen, H_{2}	0.53
Nitrous oxide, N_{2}O	0.34
Xenon, Xe	0.087
Ozone, O_{3}, in summer	up to 0.07
Nitrogen dioxide, NO_{2}	up to 0.02
Ozone, O_{3}, in winter	up to 0.02
Iodine, I_{2}	0.01

In addition, atmospheric air contains water vapour. The proportion of this is highly variable (about 0–3%; typically about 1%).

Note

The mean molecular mass of dry air is 28.97 g/mol. The composition of the gas may vary significantly from time to time and from place to place. For example, the concentrations of CO_{2} and CH_{4} vary by season and location.

=== Trace gas composition ===
Besides the major components listed above, the Earth's atmosphere contains many trace gas species that vary significantly depending on nearby sources and sinks. These trace gases include compounds such as CFCs/HCFCs which are particularly damaging to the ozone layer, and H_{2}S which has a characteristic foul odor of rotten eggs and can be smelt in concentrations as low as 0.47 ppb. Some approximate amounts near the surface of some additional gases are listed below. In addition to gases, the atmosphere contains particles in aerosol form, such as droplets, ice crystals, bacteria, and dust.

Gas	Composition (parts per trillion by volume unless otherwise stated)
Carbon monoxide, CO	40,000–200,000^{p39}
Ethene, C_{2}H_{4}	11,200^{p37, polluted}
Formaldehyde, H_{2}CO	9,100^{p37, polluted}
Acetylene, C_{2}H_{2}	8,600 ^{p37, polluted}
Methanol, CH_{3}OH	1,967
Ethane, C_{2}H_{6}	781
Dichlorodifluoromethane, CCl_{2}F_{2}	530 ^{p41}
Carbonyl sulfide, OCS	510 ^{p26}
Chloromethane, CH_{3}Cl	503
Isoprene, C_{5}H_{8}	311
Trichlorofluoromethane, CCl_{3}F	237 ^{p41}
Propane, C_{3}H_{8}	200
Hydrogen sulfide, H_{2}S	15–340 ^{p26}
Sulfur dioxide, SO_{2}	70–200 ^{p26}
Carbon tetrafluoride, CF_{4}	79 ^{p41}
Ethanol, C_{2}H_{5}OH	75
Carbon disulfide, CS_{2}	15–45 ^{p26}
Nitric oxide, NO	16
Benzene, C_{6}H_{6}	11
Bromomethane, CH_{3}Br	9–10 ^{p44}
Sulfur hexafluoride, SF_{6}	7.3 ^{p41}
Iodomethane, CH_{3}I	0.36
Total gaseous mercury, Hg	0.209 ^{p55}

== History of the discipline ==
Schematic of chemical and transport processes related to atmospheric composition

The first scientific studies of atmospheric composition began in the 18th century when chemists such as Joseph Priestley, Antoine Lavoisier and Henry Cavendish made the first measurements of the composition of the atmosphere.

In the late 19th and early 20th centuries, researchers shifted their interest towards trace constituents with very low concentrations. An important finding from this era was the discovery of ozone by Christian Friedrich Schönbein in 1840.

In the 20th century atmospheric science moved from studying the composition of air to consider how the concentrations of trace gasses in the atmosphere have changed over time and the chemical processes which create and destroy compounds in the air. Two important outcomes were the explanation by Sydney Chapman and Gordon Dobson of how the ozone layer is created and maintained, and Arie Jan Haagen-Smit’s explanation of photochemical smog. Further studies on ozone issues led to the 1995 Nobel Prize in Chemistry award shared between Paul Crutzen, Mario Molina and Frank Sherwood Rowland.

In the 21st century the focus is now shifting again. Instead of concentrating on atmospheric chemistry in isolation, it is now seen as one part of the Earth system with the rest of the atmosphere, biosphere and geosphere. A driving force for this link is the relationship between chemistry and climate. The changing climate and the recovery of the ozone hole and the interaction of the composition of the atmosphere with the oceans and terrestrial ecosystems are examples of the interdependent relationships between Earth's systems. A new field of extraterrestrial atmospheric chemistry has also recently emerged. Astrochemists analyze the atmospheric compositions of the Solar System and exoplanets to determine the formation of astronomical objects and find habitual conditions for Earth-like life.

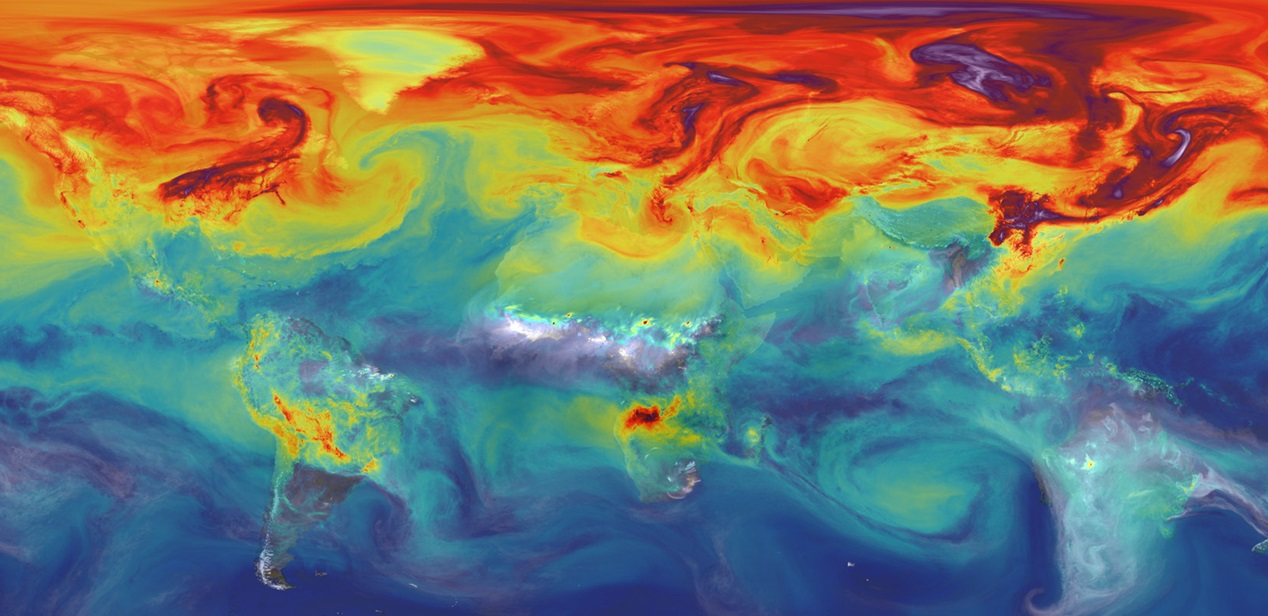
Carbon dioxide in Earth's atmosphere if half of anthropogenic CO_{2} emissions are not absorbed
(NASA simulation; 9 November 2015)

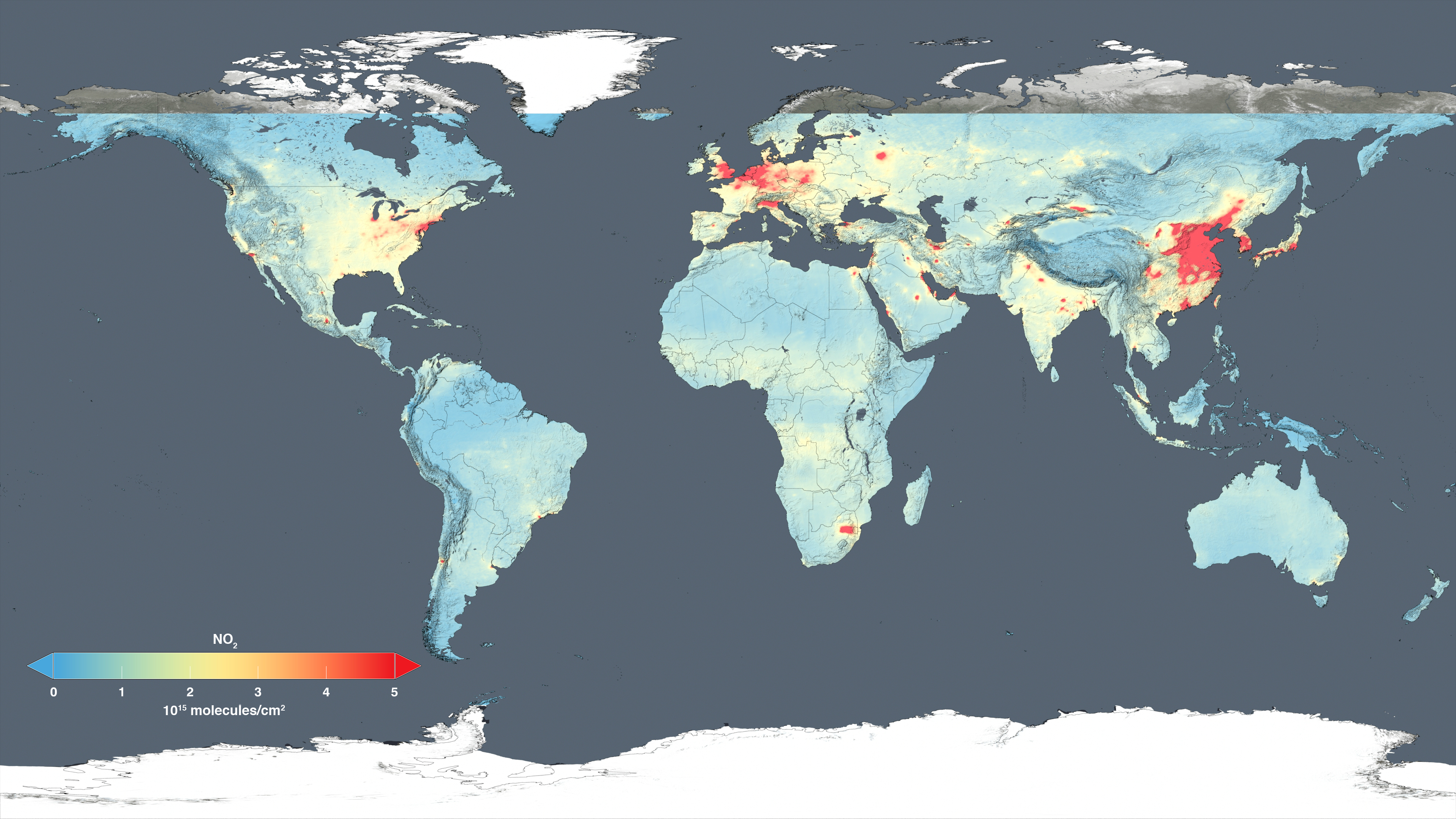
Nitrogen dioxide 2014 - global air quality levels
(released 14 December 2015)

== Methodology ==
Observations, lab measurements, and modeling are the three central elements in atmospheric chemistry. Progress in atmospheric chemistry is often driven by the interactions between these components and they form an integrated whole. For example, observations may tell us that more of a chemical compound exists than previously thought possible. This will stimulate new modeling and laboratory studies which will increase our scientific understanding to a level where we can explain the observations.

=== Observation ===
Field observations of chemical systems are essential to understanding atmospheric processes and determining the accuracy of models. Atmospheric chemistry measurements are long term to observe continuous trends or short term to observe smaller variations. In situ and remote measurements can be made using observatories, satellites, field stations, and laboratories.

Routine observations of chemical composition show changes in atmospheric composition over time. Observatories such as the Mauna Loa and mobile platforms such as aircraft ships and balloons (e.g. the UK's Facility for Airborne Atmospheric Measurements) study chemical compositions and weather dynamics. An application of long term observations is the Keeling Curve - a series of measurements from 1958 to today which show a steady rise in the concentration of carbon dioxide (see also ongoing measurements of atmospheric CO_{2}). Observations of atmospheric composition are increasingly made by satellites by passive and active remote sensing with important instruments such as GOME and MOPITT giving a global picture of air pollution and chemistry.

Surface observations have the advantage that they provide long term records at high time resolution but are limited in the vertical and horizontal space they provide observations from. Some surface based instruments e.g. LIDAR can provide concentration profiles of chemical compounds and aerosols but are still restricted in the horizontal region they can cover. Many observations are available online in Atmospheric Chemistry Observational Databases

=== Laboratory studies ===
Laboratory studies help understand the complex interactions from Earth’s systems that can be difficult to measure on a large scale. Experiments are performed in controlled environments, such as aerosol chambers, that allow for the individual evaluation of specific chemical reactions or the assessment of properties of a particular atmospheric constituent. A closely related subdiscipline is atmospheric photochemistry, which quantifies the rate that molecules are split apart by sunlight, determines the resulting products, and obtains thermodynamic data such as Henry's law coefficients.

Laboratory measurements are essential to understanding the sources and sinks of pollutants and naturally occurring compounds. Types of analysis that are of interest include both those on gas-phase reactions, as well as heterogeneous reactions that are relevant to the formation and growth of aerosols. Commonly used instruments to measure aerosols include ambient and particulate air samplers, scanning mobility particle sizers, and mass spectrometers.

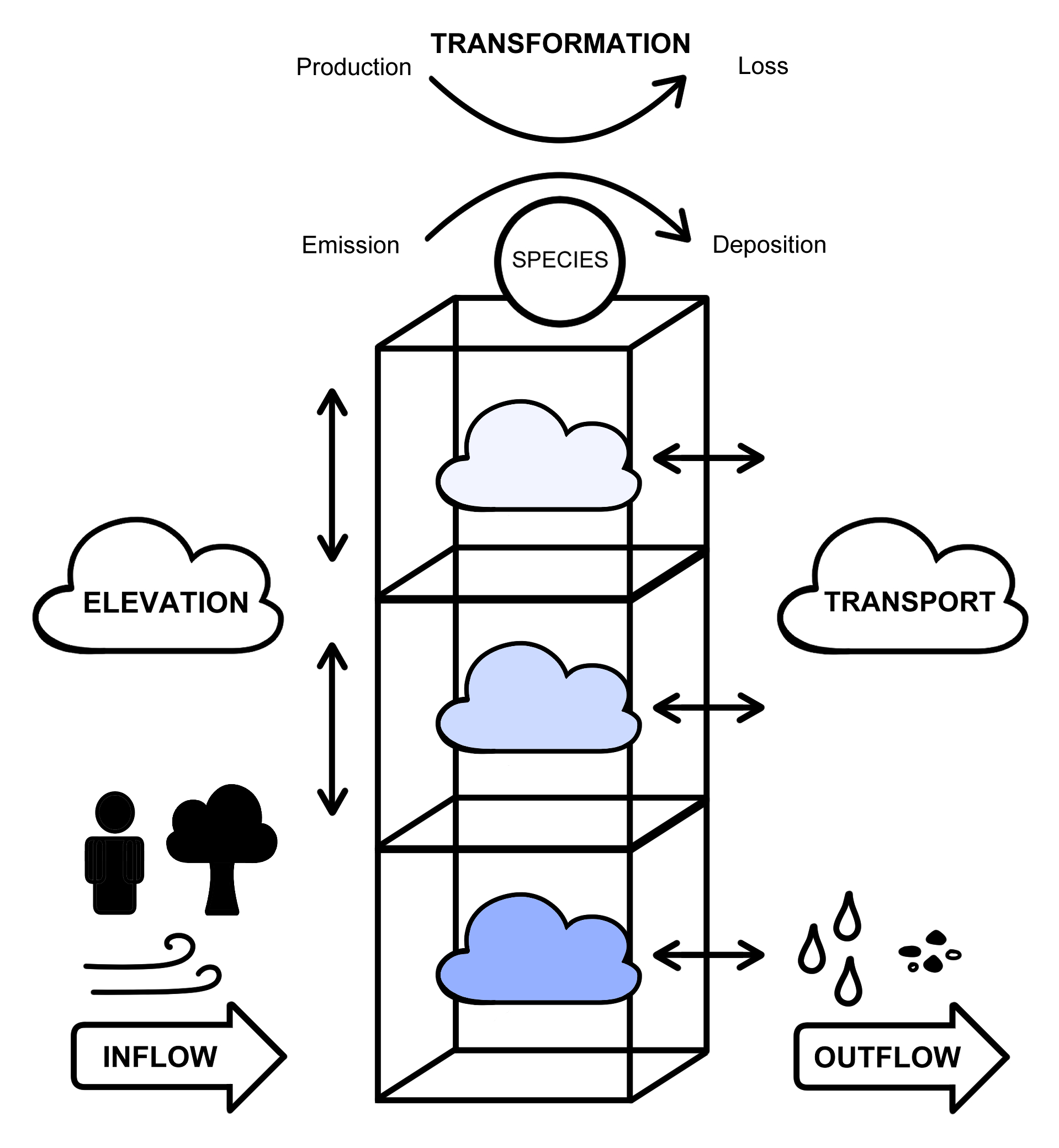
Schematic of a one-dimensional column model depicting the movement and transformation of aerosols

=== Modeling ===
Models are essential tools for interpreting observational data, testing hypotheses about chemical reactions, and predicting future concentrations of atmospheric chemicals. To synthesize and test theoretical understanding of atmospheric chemistry, researchers commonly use computer models, such as chemical transport models (CTMs). CTMs provide realistic descriptions of the three-dimensional transport and evolution of the atmosphere. Atmospheric models can be seen as mathematical representations that replicate the behavior of the atmosphere. These numerical models solve the differential equations governing the concentrations of chemicals in the atmosphere.

Depending on the complexity, these models can range from simple to highly detailed. Models can be zero-, one-, two-, or three-dimensional, each with various uses and advantages. Three-dimensional chemical transport models offer the most realistic simulations but require substantial computational resources. These models can be global e.g. TOMCAT, simulating the atmospheric conditions across the Earth, or regional, e.g. RAMS focusing on specific areas with greater resolution. Global models typically have lower horizontal resolution and represent less complex chemical mechanisms but they cover a larger area, while regional models can represent a limited area with higher resolution and more detail.

A major challenge in atmospheric modeling is balancing the number of chemical compounds and reactions included in the model with the accuracy of physical processes such as transport and mixing in the atmosphere. The two simplest types of models include box models and puff models. For example, box modeling is relatively simple and may include hundreds or even thousands of chemical reactions, but they typically use a very crude representation of atmospheric mixed layer. This makes them useful for studying specific chemical reactions, but limited in stimulating real-world dynamics. In contrast, 3D models are more complex, representing a variety of physical processes such as wind, convection, and atmospheric mixing. They also provide more realistic representations of transportation and mixing. However, computational limits often simplify chemical reactions and typically include fewer chemical reactions than box models. The trade-off between the two approaches lies in resolution and complexity.

To simplify the creation of these complex models, some researchers use automatic code generators like Autochem or Kinetic PreProcessor. These tools help automate the model-building process by selecting relevant chemical reactions from databases based on a user-defined function of chemical constituents. Once the reactions are chosen, the code generator automatically constructs the ordinary differential equations that describe their time evolution, greatly reducing the time and effort required for model construction.

Differences between model prediction and real-world observations can arise from errors in model input parameters or flaws representations of processes in the model. Some input parameters like surface emissions are often less accurately quantified from observations compared to model results. The model can be improved by adjusting poorly known parameters to better match observed data. A formal method for applying these adjustments is through Bayesian Optimization through an inverse modeling framework, where the results from the CTMs are inverted to optimize selected parameters. This approach has gained attention over the past decade as an effective method to interpret large amounts of data generate by models and observations from satellites.

One important current trend is using atmospheric chemistry as part of Earth system models. These models integrate atmospheric chemistry with other Earth system components, enabling the study of complex interactions between climate, atmospheric composition, and ecosystems.

== Applications ==
Atmospheric chemistry is a multidisciplinary field with wide-ranging applications that influence environmental policy, human health, technology development, and climate science. Examples of problems addressed in atmospheric chemistry include acid rain, ozone depletion, photochemical smog, greenhouse gasses and global warming. By developing a theoretical understanding, atmospheric chemists can test potential solutions and evaluate the effects of changes in government policy. Key applications include greenhouse gas monitoring, air quality and pollution control, weather prediction and meteorology, energy and emissions, sustainable energy development, and public health and toxicology. Green atmospheric chemistry research prioritizes the sustainable, safe, and efficient use of chemicals, which led to government regulations minimizing the use of harmful chemicals like CFCs and DDT.

Advances in remote sensing technology allow scientists to monitor atmospheric chemical composition from satellites and ground-based stations. Instruments such as the Ozone Monitoring Instrument (OMI) and Atmospheric Infrared Sounder (AIRS) provide data on pollutants, greenhouse gasses, and aerosols, enabling real-time monitoring of air quality.

Atmospheric chemistry is vital for evaluating the environmental impacts of energy production, including fossil fuels and renewable energy sources. By studying emissions, researchers can develop cleaner energy technologies and assess their effects on air quality and climate. Atmospheric chemistry also helps quantify the concentration and persistence of toxic substances in the air, including particulate matter and volatile organic compounds (VOCs), guiding public health measures and exposures assessments.

== See also ==
- Oxygen cycle
- Ozone-oxygen cycle
- Paleoclimatology
- Scientific Assessment of Ozone Depletion
- Tropospheric ozone depletion events
