= Chemical Computing Group =

Software company in Canada

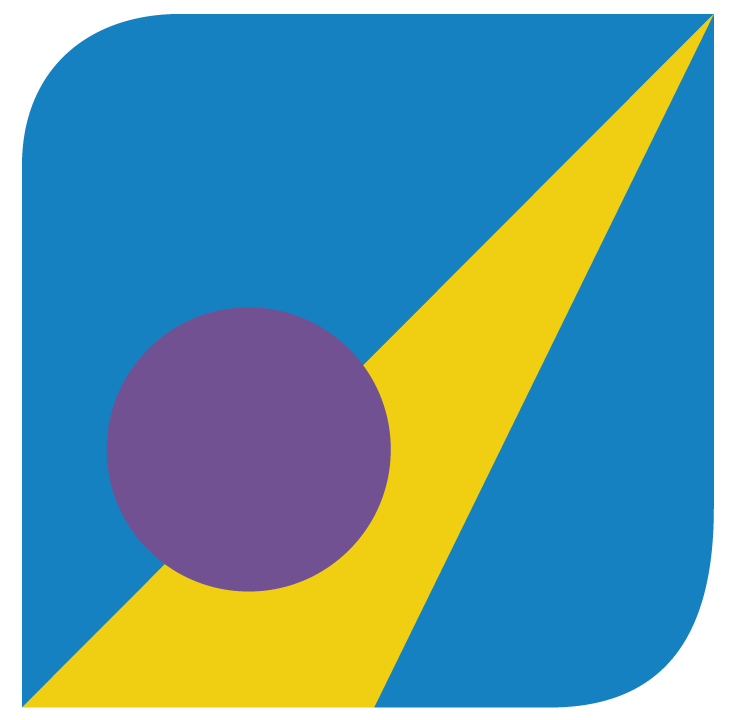
- Company type: Private
- Industry: Cheminformatics and bioinformatics software
- Headquarters: Montreal, Quebec, Canada
- Key people: Paul Labute - President, CEO
- Products: MOE, PSILO
- Number of employees: 30+
- Website: www.chemcomp.com

Chemical Computing Group is a software company specializing in research software for computational chemistry, bioinformatics, cheminformatics, docking, pharmacophore searching and molecular simulation. The company's main customer base consists of pharmaceutical and biotechnology companies, as well as academic research groups. It is a private company that was founded in 1994; it is based in Montreal, Quebec, Canada. Its main product, Molecular Operating Environment (MOE), is written in a self-contained programming system, the Scientific Vector Language (SVL).

== Products ==
- MOE (Molecular Operating Environment)

MOE is a drug discovery software platform that integrates visualization, modeling, and simulations, as well as methodology development. MOE scientific applications are used by biologists, medicinal chemists and computational chemists in pharmaceutical, biotechnology and academic research. MOE runs on Windows, Linux, Unix, and MAC OS X.

Main application areas: Structure-Based Design, Fragment-Based Design, Pharmacophore Discovery, Medicinal Chemistry Applications, Biologics Applications, Protein and Antibody Modeling, Molecular Modeling and Simulations, Cheminformatics & QSAR

- PSILO: A Protein Structure Database System

PSILO is a protein structure database system that provides a repository for macromolecular and protein-ligand structural information. It allows research organizations to track, register and search both experimental and computational macromolecular structural data. A web-browser interface facilitates the searching and accessing of public and private structural data.
