= Chemical WorkBench =

Chemistry simulation software

Chemical WorkBench is a proprietary simulation software tool aimed at the reactor scale kinetic modeling of homogeneous gas-phase and heterogeneous processes and kinetic mechanism development. It can be effectively used for the modeling, optimization, and design of a wide range of industrially and environmentally important chemistry-loaded processes. Chemical WorkBench is a modeling environment based on advanced scientific approaches, complementary databases, and accurate solution methods. Chemical WorkBench is developed and distributed by Kintech Lab.

== Chemical WorkBench models ==
Chemical WorkBench has an extensive library of physicochemical models:

- Thermodynamic Models
- Gas-Phase Kinetic Models
- Flame model
- Heterogeneous Kinetic Models
- Non-Equilibrium Plasma Models
- Detonation and Aerodynamic Models
- Membrane Separation Models
- Mechanism Analysis and Reduction

== See also ==
- Chemical kinetics
- Autochem
- Cantera
- CHEMKIN
- Kinetic PreProcessor (KPP)
- Laboratory information management system
