= Atomistix ToolKit =

QuantumATK (formerly Atomistix ToolKit or ATK) is a commercial software for atomic-scale modeling and simulation of nanosystems. The software was originally developed by Atomistix A/S, and was later acquired by QuantumWise following the Atomistix bankruptcy. QuantumWise was then acquired by Synopsys in 2017.

Atomistix ToolKit is a further development of TranSIESTA-C, which in turn is based on the technology, models, and algorithms developed in the academic codes TranSIESTA, and McDCal, employing localized basis sets as developed in SIESTA.

== Features ==
Atomistix ToolKit combines density functional theory with non-equilibrium Green's functions for first principles electronic structure and transport calculations of

- electrode—nanostructure—electrode systems (two-probe systems)
- molecules
- periodic systems (bulk crystals and nanotubes)

The key features are

- Calculation of transport properties of two-probe systems under an applied bias voltage
- Calculation of energy spectra, wave functions, electron densities, atomic forces, effective potentials etc.
- Calculation of spin-polarized physical properties
- Geometry optimization
- A Python-based NanoLanguage scripting environment

== See also ==
- Atomistix Virtual NanoLab — a graphical user interface
- NanoLanguage
- Atomistix
- Quantum chemistry computer programs
- Molecular mechanics programs
