= Potential applications of carbon nanotubes =

Carbon nanotubes (CNTs) are cylinders of one or more layers of graphene (lattice). Diameters of single-walled carbon nanotubes (SWNTs) and multi-walled carbon nanotubes (MWNTs) are typically 0.8 to 2 nm and 5 to 20 nm, respectively, although MWNT diameters can exceed 100 nm. CNT lengths range from less than 100 nm to 0.5 m.

Individual CNT walls can be metallic or semiconducting depending on the orientation of the lattice with respect to the tube axis, which is called chirality. MWNT's cross-sectional area offers an elastic modulus approaching 1 TPa and a tensile strength of 100 GPa, over 10-fold higher than any industrial fiber. MWNTs are typically metallic and can carry currents of up to 10^{9} A cm^{−2}. SWNTs can display thermal conductivity of 3500 W m^{−1} K^{−1}, exceeding that of diamond.

As of 2013, carbon nanotube production exceeded several thousand tons per year, used for applications in energy storage, device modelling, automotive parts, boat hulls, sporting goods, water filters, thin-film electronics, coatings, actuators and electromagnetic shields. CNT-related publications more than tripled in the prior decade, while rates of patent issuance also increased. Most output was of unorganized architecture. Organized CNT architectures such as "forests", yarns and regular sheets were produced in much smaller volumes. CNTs have even been proposed as the tether for a purported space elevator.

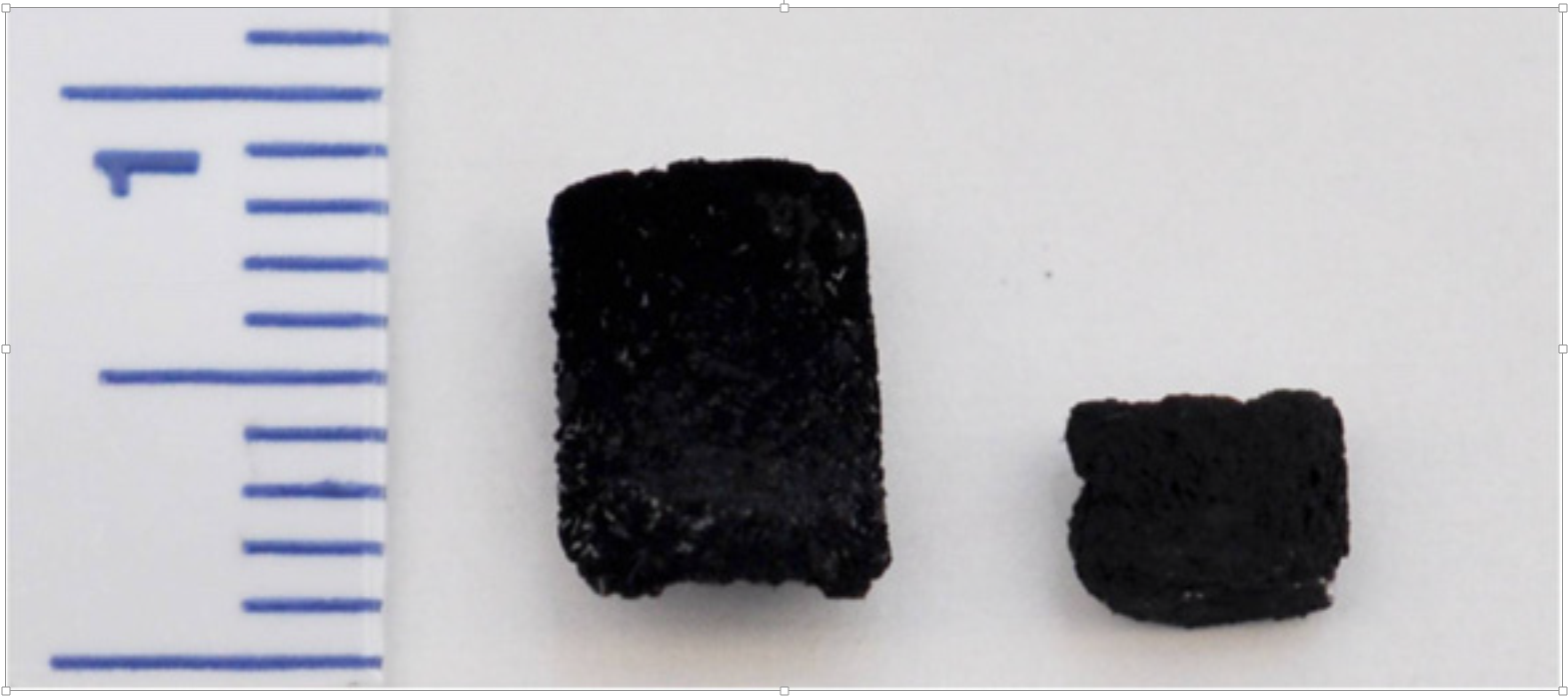
3D carbon nanotube scaffolds

Recently, several studies have highlighted the prospect of using carbon nanotubes as building blocks to fabricate three-dimensional macroscopic (>1 mm in all three dimensions) all-carbon devices. Lalwani et al. have reported a novel radical initiated thermal crosslinking method to fabricated macroscopic, free-standing, porous, all-carbon scaffolds using single- and multi-walled carbon nanotubes as building blocks. These scaffolds possess macro-, micro-, and nano- structured pores and the porosity can be tailored for specific applications. These 3D all-carbon scaffolds/architectures may be used for the fabrication of the next generation of energy storage, supercapacitors, field emission transistors, high-performance catalysis, photovoltaics, and biomedical devices and implants.

== Biological and biomedical research ==
Researchers from Rice University and State University of New York – Stony Brook have shown that the addition of low weight % of carbon nanotubes can lead to significant improvements in the mechanical properties of biodegradable polymeric nanocomposites for applications in tissue engineering including bone, cartilage, muscle and nerve tissue. Dispersion of low weight % of graphene (~0.02 wt.%) results in significant increases in compressive and flexural mechanical properties of polymeric nanocomposites. Researchers at Rice University, Stony Brook University, Radboud University Nijmegen Medical Centre and University of California, Riverside have shown that carbon nanotubes and their polymer nanocomposites are suitable scaffold materials for bone tissue engineering and bone formation.

Compared to the commonly used polyurethane in prosthetic feet, CNT natural rubber composites with just 1% carbon nanotubes show a 25% boost in tensile strength. Additionally, this small CNT addition improves dimensional stability by 20% and heat resistance by 15% over natural rubber.

CNTs exhibit dimensional and chemical compatibility with biomolecules, such as DNA and proteins. CNTs enable fluorescent and photoacoustic imaging, as well as localized heating using near-infrared radiation.

SWNT biosensors exhibit large changes in electrical impedance and optical properties, which is typically modulated by adsorption of a target on the CNT surface. Low detection limits and high selectivity require engineering the CNT surface and field effects, capacitance, Raman spectral shifts and photoluminescence for sensor design. Products under development include printed test strips for estrogen and progesterone detection, microarrays for DNA and protein detection and sensors for NO_{2} and cardiac troponin. Similar CNT sensors support food industry, military and environmental applications.

CNTs can be internalized by cells, first by binding their tips to cell membrane receptors. This enables transfection of molecular cargo attached to the CNT walls or encapsulated by CNTs. For example, the cancer drug doxorubicin was loaded at up to 60 wt % on CNTs compared with a maximum of 8 to 10 wt % on liposomes. Cargo release can be triggered by near-infrared radiation. However, limiting the retention of CNTs within the body is critical to prevent undesirable accumulation.

CNT toxicity remains a concern, although CNT biocompatibility may be engineerable. The degree of lung inflammation caused by injection of well-dispersed SWNTs was insignificant compared with asbestos and with particulate matter in air. Medical acceptance of CNTs requires understanding of immune response and appropriate exposure standards for inhalation, injection, ingestion and skin contact. CNT forests immobilized in a polymer did not show elevated inflammatory response in rats relative to controls. CNTs are under consideration as low-impedance neural interface electrodes and for coating of catheters to reduce thrombosis.

CNT enabled x-ray sources for medical imaging are also in development. Relying on the unique properties of the CNTs, researchers have developed field emission cathodes that allow precise x-ray control and close placement of multiple sources. CNT enabled x-ray sources have been demonstrated for pre-clinical, small animal imaging applications, and are currently in clinical trials.

In November 2012 researchers at the American National Institute of Standards and Technology (NIST) proved that single-wall carbon nanotubes may help protect DNA molecules from damage by oxidation.

A highly effective method of delivering carbon nanotubes into cells is Cell squeezing, a high-throughput vector-free microfluidic platform for intracellular delivery developed at the Massachusetts Institute of Technology in the labs of Robert S. Langer.

Carbon nanotubes have furthermore been grown inside microfluidic channels for chemical analysis, based on electrochromatography. Here, the high surface-area-to-volume ratio and high hydrophobicity of CNTs are used in order to greatly decrease the analysis time of small neutral molecules that typically require large bulky equipment for analysis.

== Composite materials ==
Because of the carbon nanotube's superior mechanical properties, many structures have been proposed ranging from everyday items like clothes and sports gear to combat jackets and space elevators. However, the space elevator will require further efforts in refining carbon nanotube technology, as the practical tensile strength of carbon nanotubes must be greatly improved.

Applications of CNTs/polymer composites in the automotive sector highlight technological advancements across various systems, particularly in body components, electrical systems, and engine parts. Incorporating CNTs with fiberglass reinforcement in epoxy composites can boost strength by 60% and impact energy resistance by 30%. These improvements could significantly reduce fuel consumption by 16% and greenhouse gas emissions by 26%. Additionally, CNT fillers, effective even at low concentrations (0.2 wt.%), enhance dimensional and thermal stability while reducing overall weight. A 25% reduction in vehicle weight could save up to 250 million barrels of crude oil annually.

Pioneering work led by Ray H. Baughman at the NanoTech Institute has shown that single and multi-walled nanotubes can produce materials with toughness unmatched in the man-made and natural worlds.

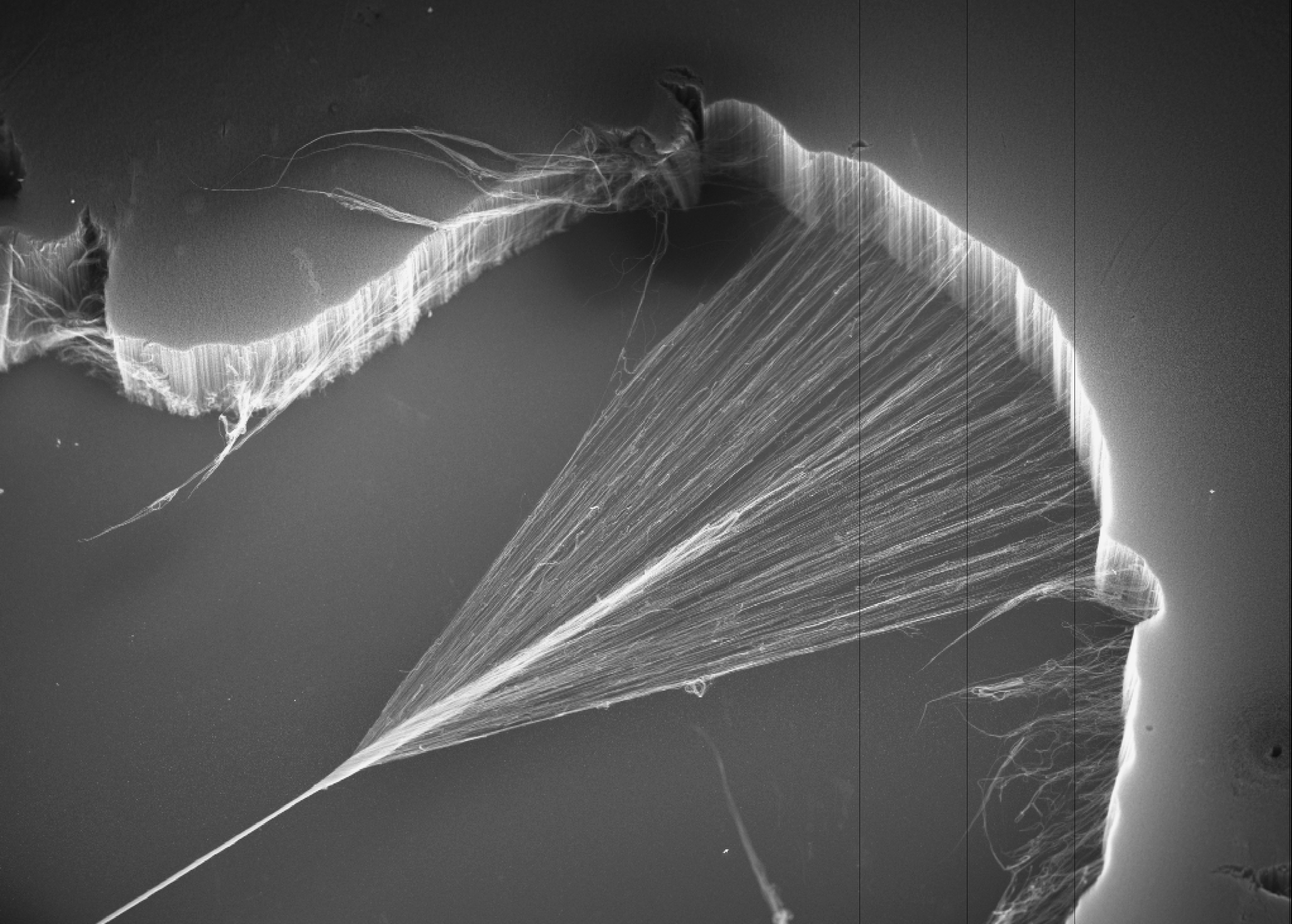
Carbon nanotubes being spun to form a yarn, CSIRO

Carbon nanotubes are also a promising material as building blocks in hierarchical composite materials given their exceptional mechanical properties (~1 TPa in modulus, and ~100 GPa in strength). Initial attempts to incorporate CNTs into hierarchical structures (such as yarns, fibres or films) has led to mechanical properties that were significantly lower than these potential limits. The hierarchical integration of multi-walled carbon nanotubes and metal/metal oxides within a single nanostructure can leverage the potentiality of carbon nanotubes composite for water splitting and electrocatalysis. Windle et al. have used an in situ chemical vapor deposition (CVD) spinning method to produce continuous CNT yarns from CVD-grown CNT aerogels. CNT yarns can also be manufactured by drawing out CNT bundles from a CNT forest and subsequently twisting to form the fibre (draw-twist method, see picture on right). The Windle group have fabricated CNT yarns with strengths as high as ~9 GPa at small gage lengths of ~1 mm, however, strengths of only about ~1 GPa were reported at the longer gage length of 20 mm. The reason why fibre strengths have been low compared to the strength of individual CNTs is due to a failure to effectively transfer load to the constituent (discontinuous) CNTs within the fibre. One potential route for alleviating this problem is via irradiation (or deposition) induced covalent inter-bundle and inter-CNT cross-linking to effectively 'join up' the CNTs, with higher dosage levels leading to the possibility of amorphous carbon/carbon nanotube composite fibres. Espinosa et al. developed high performance DWNT-polymer composite yarns by twisting and stretching ribbons of randomly oriented bundles of DWNTs thinly coated with polymeric organic compounds. These DWNT-polymer yarns exhibited an unusually high energy to failure of ~100 J·g^{−1} (comparable to one of the toughest natural materials – spider silk), and strength as high as ~1.4 GPa. Effort is ongoing to produce CNT composites that incorporate tougher matrix materials, such as Kevlar, to further improve on the mechanical properties toward those of individual CNTs.

Because of the high mechanical strength of carbon nanotubes, research is being made into weaving them into clothes to create stab-proof and bulletproof clothing. The nanotubes would effectively stop the bullet from penetrating the body, although the bullet's kinetic energy would likely cause broken bones and internal bleeding.

Carbon nanotubes can also enable shorter processing times and higher energy efficiencies during composite curing with the use of carbon nanotube structured heaters. Autoclaving is the 'gold standard' for composite curing however, it comes at a high price and introduces part size limitations. Researchers estimate that curing a small section of the Boeing 787 carbon fiber/epoxy fuselage requires 350 GJ of energy and produces 80 tons of carbon dioxide. This is about the same amount of energy that nine households would consume in one year. In addition, eliminating part size limitations eliminates the need to join small composite components to create large scale structures. This saves manufacturing time and results in higher strength structures.

Carbon nanotube structured heaters show promise in replacing autoclaves and conventional ovens for composite curing because of their ability to reach high temperatures at fast ramping rates with high electrical efficiency and mechanical flexibility. These nanostructured heaters can take the form of a film and be applied directly to the composite. This results in conductive heat transfer as opposed to convective heat transfer used by autoclaves and conventional ovens. Lee et al. reported that only 50% of the thermal energy introduced in an autoclave is transferred to the composite being cured regardless of part size, while about 90% of the thermal energy is transferred in a nanostructured film heater depending on the process.

Lee et al. were able to successfully cure aerospace-grade composites using a CNT heater made by "domino-pushing" a CNT forest onto a Teflon film. This film was then laid on top of an 8-ply OOA prepreg layup. Thermal insulation was incorporated around the assembly. The entire setup was subsequently vacuum bagged and heated using a 30 V DC power supply. Degree-of-cure and mechanical tests were conducted to compare conventionally cured composites against their OOA set-up. Results showed that there was no difference in the quality of the composite created. However, the amount of energy required to cure the composite OOA was reduced by two orders of magnitude from 13.7 MJ to 118.8 kJ.

Before carbon nanotubes can be used to cure Boeing 787 fuselages however, further development needs to occur. The largest challenge associated with creating reliable carbon nanotube structured heaters is being able to create a uniform carbon nanotube dispersion in a polymer matrix to ensure heat is applied evenly. CNTs high surface area results in strong Van Der Waals forces between individual CNTs, causing them to agglomerate together and yielding non-uniform heating properties. In addition, the polymer matrix chosen needs to be carefully chosen such that it can withstand the high temperatures generated and the repetitive thermal cycling required to cure multiple composite components.

=== Mixtures ===
MWNTs were first used as electrically conductive fillers in metals, at concentrations as high as 83.78 percent by weight (wt%). MWNT-polymer composites reach conductivities as high as 10,000 S m^{−1} at 10 wt % loading. In the automotive industry, CNT plastics are used in electrostatic-assisted painting of mirror housings, as well as fuel lines and filters that dissipate electrostatic charge. Other products include electromagnetic interference (EMI)–shielding packages and silicon wafer carriers.

For load-bearing applications, CNT powders are mixed with polymers or precursor resins to increase stiffness, strength and toughness. These enhancements depend on CNT diameter, aspect ratio, alignment, dispersion and interfacial interaction. Premixed resins and master batches employ CNT loadings from 0.1 to 20 wt%. Nanoscale stick-slip among CNTs and CNT-polymer contacts can increase material damping, enhancing sporting goods, including tennis racquets, baseball bats and bicycle frames.

CNT resins enhance fiber composites, including wind turbine blades and hulls for maritime security boats that are made by enhancing carbon fiber composites with CNT-enhanced resin. CNTs are deployed as additives in the organic precursors of stronger 1 μm-diameter carbon fibers. CNTs influence the arrangement of carbon in pyrolyzed fiber.

Toward the challenge of organizing CNTs at larger scales, hierarchical fiber composites are created by growing aligned forests onto glass, silicon carbide (SiC), alumina and carbon fibers, creating so-called "fuzzy" fibers. Fuzzy epoxy CNT-SiC and CNT-alumina fabric showed 69% improved crack-opening (mode I) and/or in-plane shear interlaminar (mode II) toughness. Applications under investigation include lightning-strike protection, deicing, and structural health monitoring for aircraft.

MWNTs can be used as a flame-retardant additive to plastics due to changes in rheology by nanotube loading. Such additives can replace halogenated flame retardants, which face environmental restrictions.

CNT/Concrete blends offer increased tensile strength and reduced crack propagation.

Buckypaper (nanotube aggregate) can significantly improve fire resistance due to efficient heat reflection.

=== Textiles ===
The previous studies on the use of CNTs for textile functionalization were focused on fiber spinning for improving physical and mechanical properties. Recently a great deal of attention has been focused on coating CNTs on textile fabrics. Various methods have been employed for modifying fabrics using CNTs. produced intelligent e-textiles for Human Biomonitoring using a polyelectrolyte-based coating with CNTs. Additionally, Panhuis et al. dyed textile material by immersion in either a poly (2-methoxy aniline-5-sulfonic acid) PMAS polymer solution or PMAS-SWNT dispersion with enhanced conductivity and capacitance with a durable behavior. In another study, Hu and coworkers coated single-walled carbon nanotubes with a simple "dipping and drying" process for wearable electronics and energy storage applications. In the recent study, Li and coworkers using elastomeric separator and almost achieved a fully stretchable supercapacitor based on buckled single-walled carbon nanotube macrofilms. The electrospun polyurethane was used and provided sound mechanical stretchability and the whole cell achieve excellent charge-discharge cycling stability. CNTs have an aligned nanotube structure and a negative surface charge. Therefore, they have similar structures to direct dyes, so the exhaustion method is applied for coating and absorbing CNTs on the fiber surface for preparing multifunctional fabric including antibacterial, electric conductive, flame retardant and electromagnetic absorbance properties.

Later, CNT yarns and laminated sheets made by direct chemical vapor deposition (CVD) or forest spinning or drawing methods may compete with carbon fiber for high-end uses, especially in weight-sensitive applications requiring combined electrical and mechanical functionality. Research yarns made from few-walled CNTs have reached a stiffness of 357 GPa and a strength of 8.8 GPa for a gauge length comparable to the millimeter-long CNTs within the yarn. Centimeter-scale gauge lengths offer only 2-GPa gravimetric strengths, matching that of Kevlar.

Because the probability of a critical flaw increases with volume, yarns may never achieve the strength of individual CNTs. However, CNT's high surface area may provide interfacial coupling that mitigates these deficiencies. CNT yarns can be knotted without loss of strength. Coating forest-drawn CNT sheets with functional powder before inserting twist yields weavable, braidable and sewable yarns containing up to 95 wt % powder. Uses include superconducting wires, battery and fuel cell electrodes and self-cleaning textiles.

As yet impractical fibers of aligned SWNTs can be made by coagulation-based spinning of CNT suspensions. Cheaper SWNTs or spun MWNTs are necessary for commercialization. Carbon nanotubes can be dissolved in superacids such as fluorosulfuric acid and drawn into fibers in dry jet-wet spinning.

DWNT-polymer composite yarns have been made by twisting and stretching ribbons of randomly oriented bundles of DWNTs thinly coated with polymeric organic compounds.

Body armor—combat jackets Cambridge University developed the fibres and licensed a company to make them. In comparison, the bullet-resistant fiber Kevlar fails at 27–33 J/g.

Synthetic muscles offer high contraction/extension ratio given an electric current.

SWNT are in use as an experimental material for removable, structural bridge panels.

In 2015, researchers incorporated CNTs and graphene into spider silk, increasing its strength and toughness to a new record. They sprayed 15 Pholcidae spiders with water containing the nanotubes or flakes. The resulting silk had a fracture strength up to 5.4 GPa, a Young's modulus up to 47.8 GPa and a toughness modulus up to 2.1 GPa, surpassing both synthetic polymeric high performance fibres (e.g. Kevlar49) and knotted fibers.

SWNTs can enable water-repellent properties in textiles. Treating cotton fabrics with SWNTs creates an artificial lotus leaf structure, resulting in a rough surface. Modified conductive e-textiles exhibit excellent repeatability, washability, durability, and super-hydrophobic performance. These textiles are used in protective workwear, technical textiles, medical fabrics, technical garments for extreme outdoor sports, automotive and aeronautical textiles, wearable sensors, smart textiles, etc.

Carbon nanotubes (CNTs) demonstrate excellent UV-blocking properties and can be incorporated into textiles by coating them with a polymer solution. The UV transmission of fabrics coated with CNTs is nearly zero, indicating that these polymer-coated fabrics can effectively protect the wearer from both UVA and UVB rays.

=== Carbon nanotube springs ===
"Forests" of stretched, aligned MWNT springs can achieve an energy density 10 times greater than that of steel springs, offering cycling durability, temperature insensitivity, no spontaneous discharge and arbitrary discharge rate. SWNT forests are expected to be able to store far more than MWNTs.

=== Alloys ===
Adding small amounts of CNTs to metals increases tensile strength and modulus with potential in aerospace and automotive structures. Commercial aluminum-MWNT composites have strengths comparable to stainless steel (0.7 to 1 GPa) at one-third the density (2.6 g cm^{−3}), comparable to more expensive aluminium-lithium alloys.

=== Coatings and films ===
CNTs can serve as a multifunctional coating material. For example, paint/MWNT mixtures can reduce biofouling of ship hulls by discouraging attachment of algae and barnacles. They are a possible alternative to environmentally hazardous biocide-containing paints. Mixing CNTs into anticorrosion coatings for metals can enhance coating stiffness and strength and provide a path for cathodic protection.

CNTs provide a less expensive alternative to ITO for a range of consumer devices. Besides cost, CNT's flexible, transparent conductors offer an advantage over brittle ITO coatings for flexible displays. CNT conductors can be deposited from solution and patterned by methods such as screen printing. SWNT films offer 90% transparency and a sheet resistivity of 100 ohm per square. Such films are under development for thin-film heaters, such as for defrosting windows or sidewalks.

Carbon nanotubes forests and foams can also be coated with a variety of different materials to change their functionality and performance. Examples include silicon coated CNTs to create flexible energy-dense batteries, graphene coatings to create highly elastic aerogels and silicon carbide coatings to create a strong structural material for robust high-aspect-ratio 3D-micro architectures.

There is a wide range of methods how CNTs can be formed into coatings and films.

==== Optical power detectors ====
A spray-on mixture of carbon nanotubes and ceramic demonstrates unprecedented ability to resist damage while absorbing laser light. Such coatings that absorb the energy of high-powered lasers without breaking down are essential for optical power detectors that measure the output of such lasers. These are used, for example, in military equipment for defusing unexploded mines. The composite consists of multiwall carbon nanotubes and a ceramic made of silicon, carbon and nitrogen. Including boron boosts the breakdown temperature. The nanotubes and graphene-like carbon transmit heat well, while the oxidation-resistant ceramic boosts damage resistance. Creating the coating involves dispersing the nanotubes in toluene, to which a clear liquid polymer containing boron was added. The mixture was heated to 1,100 °C (2,010 °F). The result is crushed into a fine powder, dispersed again in toluene and sprayed in a thin coat on a copper surface. The coating absorbed 97.5 percent of the light from a far-infrared laser and tolerated 15 kilowatts per square centimeter for 10 seconds. Damage tolerance is about 50 percent higher than for similar coatings, e.g., nanotubes alone and carbon paint.

==== Radar absorption ====
Radars work in the microwave frequency range, which can be absorbed by MWNTs. Applying the MWNTs to the aircraft would cause the radar to be absorbed and therefore seem to have a smaller radar cross-section. One such application could be to paint the nanotubes onto the plane. Recently there has been some work done at the University of Michigan regarding carbon nanotubes' usefulness as stealth technology on aircraft. It has been found that in addition to the radar absorbing properties, the nanotubes neither reflect nor scatter visible light, making it essentially invisible at night, much like painting current stealth aircraft black except much more effective. Current limitations in manufacturing, however, mean that the current production of nanotube-coated aircraft is not possible. One theory to overcome these current limitations is to cover small particles with the nanotubes and suspend the nanotube-covered particles in a medium such as paint, which can then be applied to a surface, like a stealth aircraft.

In 2010, Lockheed Martin Corporation applied for a patent for just such a CNT based radar-absorbent material, which was reassigned and granted to Applied NanoStructure Solutions, LLC in 2012. Some believe that this material is incorporated in the F-35 Lightning II.

== Microelectronics ==
Nanotube-based transistors, also known as carbon nanotube field-effect transistors (CNTFETs), have been made that operate at room temperature and that are capable of digital switching using a single electron. However, one major obstacle to realization of nanotubes has been the lack of technology for mass production. In 2001, IBM researchers demonstrated how metallic nanotubes can be destroyed, leaving semiconducting ones behind for use as transistors. Their process is called "constructive destruction," which includes the automatic destruction of defective nanotubes on the wafer. This process, however, only gives control over the electrical properties on a statistical scale.

SWNTs are attractive for transistors because of their low electron scattering and their bandgap. SWNTs are compatible with field-effect transistor (FET) architectures and high-κ dielectrics. Despite progress following the CNT transistor's appearance in 1998, including a tunneling FET with a subthreshold swing of <60 mV per decade (2004), a radio (2007) and an FET with sub-10-nm channel length and a normalized current density of 2.41 mA μm^{−1} at 0.5 V, greater than those obtained for silicon devices.

However, control of diameter, chirality, density and placement remains insufficient for commercial production. Less demanding devices of tens to thousands of SWNTs are more immediately practical. The use of CNT arrays/transistor increases output current and compensates for defects and chirality differences, improving device uniformity and reproducibility. For example, transistors using horizontally aligned CNT arrays achieved mobilities of 80 cm^{2} V^{−1} s^{−1}, subthreshold slopes of 140 mV per decade and on/off ratios as high as 10^{5}. CNT film deposition methods enable conventional semiconductor fabrication of more than 10,000 CNT devices per chip.

Printed CNT thin-film transistors (TFTs) are attractive for driving organic light-emitting diode displays, showing higher mobility than amorphous silicon (~1 cm^{2} V^{−1} s^{−1}) and can be deposited by low-temperature, nonvacuum methods. Flexible CNT TFTs with a mobility of 35 cm^{2} V^{−1} s^{−1} and an on/off ratio of 6×10^{6} were demonstrated. A vertical CNT FET showed sufficient current output to drive OLEDs at low voltage, enabling red-green-blue emission through a transparent CNT network. CNTs are under consideration for radio-frequency identification tags. Selective retention of semiconducting SWNTs during spin-coating and reduced sensitivity to adsorbates were demonstrated.

The International Technology Roadmap for Semiconductors suggests that CNTs could replace Cu interconnects in integrated circuits, owing to their low scattering, high current-carrying capacity, and resistance to electromigration. For this, vias comprising tightly packed (>10^{13} cm^{−2}) metallic CNTs with low defect density and low contact resistance are needed. Recently, complementary–metal–oxide semiconductor (CMOS)-compatible 150-nm-diameter interconnects with a single CNT–contact hole resistance of 2.8 kOhm were demonstrated on full 200 mm-diameter wafers. Also, as a replacement for solder bumps, CNTs can function both as electrical leads and heat dissipaters for use in high-power amplifiers.

Last, a concept for a nonvolatile memory based on individual CNT crossbar electromechanical switches has been adapted for commercialization by patterning tangled CNT thin films as the functional elements. This required development of ultrapure CNT suspensions that can be spin-coated and processed in industrial clean room environments and are therefore compatible with CMOS processing standards.

=== Transistors ===
Carbon nanotube field-effect transistors (CNTFETs) can operate at room temperature and are capable of digital switching using a single electron. In 2013, a CNT logic circuit was demonstrated that could perform useful work. Major obstacles to nanotube-based microelectronics include the absence of technology for mass production, circuit density, positioning of individual electrical contacts, sample purity, control over length, chirality and desired alignment, thermal budget and contact resistance.

One of the main challenges was regulating conductivity. Depending on subtle surface features, a nanotube may act as a conductor or as a semiconductor.

Another way to make carbon nanotube transistors has been to use random networks of them. By doing so one averages all of their electrical differences and one can produce devices in large scale at the wafer level. This approach was first patented by Nanomix Inc. (date of original application June 2002). It was first published in the academic literature by the United States Naval Research Laboratory in 2003 through independent research work. This approach also enabled Nanomix to make the first transistor on a flexible and transparent substrate.

Since the electron mean free path in SWCNTs can exceed 1 micrometer, long channel CNTFETs exhibit near-ballistic transport characteristics, resulting in high speeds. CNT devices are projected to operate in the frequency range of hundreds of gigahertz.

Nanotubes can be grown on nanoparticles of magnetic metal (Fe, Co) that facilitates production of electronic (spintronic) devices. In particular control of current through a field-effect transistor by magnetic field has been demonstrated in such a single-tube nanostructure.

==== History ====
In 2001, IBM researchers demonstrated how metallic nanotubes can be destroyed, leaving semiconducting nanotubes for use as components. Using "constructive destruction", they destroyed defective nanotubes on the wafer. This process, however, only gives control over the electrical properties on a statistical scale. In 2003, room-temperature ballistic transistors with ohmic metal contacts and high-κ gate dielectric were reported, showing 20–30x more current than state-of-the-art siliconMOSFETs. Palladium is a high-work function metal that was shown to exhibit Schottky barrier-free contacts to semiconducting nanotubes with diameters >1.7 nm.

The potential of carbon nanotubes was demonstrated in 2003 when room-temperature ballistic transistors with ohmic metal contacts and high-κ gate dielectric were reported, showing 20–30x higher ON current than state-of-the-art Si MOSFETs. This presented an important advance in the field as CNT was shown to potentially outperform Si. At the time, a major challenge was ohmic metal contact formation. In this regard, palladium, which is a high-work function metal was shown to exhibit Schottky barrier-free contacts to semiconducting nanotubes with diameters >1.7 nm.

The first nanotube integrated memory circuit was made in 2004. One of the main challenges has been regulating the conductivity of nanotubes. Depending on subtle surface features a nanotube may act as a plain conductor or as a semiconductor. A fully automated method has however been developed to remove non-semiconductor tubes.

In 2013, researchers demonstrated a Turing-complete prototype micrometer-scale computer. Carbon nanotube transistors as logic-gate circuits with densities comparable to modern CMOS technology has not yet been demonstrated.

In 2014, networks of purified semiconducting carbon nanotubes were used as the active material in p-type thin film transistors. They were created using 3D printers using inkjet or gravure methods on flexible substrates, including polyimide and polyethylene (PET) and transparent substrates such as glass. These transistors reliably exhibit high-mobilities (> 10 cm^{2} V^{−1} s^{−1}) and ON/OFF ratios (> 1000) as well as threshold voltages below 5 V. They offer current density and low power consumption as well as environmental stability and mechanical flexibility. Hysterisis in the current-voltage curses as well as variability in the threshold voltage remain to be solved.

In 2015, researchers announced a new way to connect wires to SWNTs that make it possible to continue shrinking the width of the wires without increasing electrical resistance. The advance was expected to shrink the contact point between the two materials to just 40 atoms in width and later less. They tubes align in regularly spaced rows on silicon wafers. Simulations indicated that designs could be optimized either for high performance or for low power consumption. Commercial devices were not expected until the 2020s.

=== Thermal management ===
Large structures of carbon nanotubes can be used for thermal management of electronic circuits. An approximately 1 mm–thick carbon nanotube layer was used as a special material to fabricate coolers, this material has very low density, ~20 times lower weight than a similar copper structure, while the cooling properties are similar for the two materials.

Buckypaper has characteristics appropriate for use as a heat sink for chipboards, a backlight for LCD screens or as a faraday cage.

== Solar cells ==
One of the promising applications of single-walled carbon nanotubes (SWNTs) is their use in solar panels, due to their strong UV/Vis-NIR absorption characteristics. Research has shown that they can provide a sizable increase in efficiency, even at their current unoptimized state. Solar cells developed at the New Jersey Institute of Technology use a carbon nanotube complex, formed by a mixture of carbon nanotubes and carbon buckyballs (known as fullerenes) to form snake-like structures. Buckyballs trap electrons, but they can't make electrons flow. Add sunlight to excite the polymers, and the buckyballs will grab the electrons. Nanotubes, behaving like copper wires, will then be able to make the electrons or current flow.

Additional research has been conducted on creating SWNT hybrid solar panels to increase the efficiency further. These hybrids are created by combining SWNT's with photo-excitable electron donors to increase the number of electrons generated. It has been found that the interaction between the photo-excited porphyrin and SWNT generates electro-hole pairs at the SWNT surfaces. This phenomenon has been observed experimentally, and contributes practically to an increase in efficiency up to 8.5%.

Nanotubes can potentially replace indium tin oxide in solar cells as a transparent conductive film in solar cells to allow light to pass to the active layers and generate photocurrent.

CNTs in organic solar cells help reduce energy loss (carrier recombination) and enhance resistance to photooxidation. Photovoltaic technologies may someday incorporate CNT-Silicon heterojunctions to leverage efficient multiple-exciton generation at p-n junctions formed within individual CNTs. In the nearer term, commercial photovoltaics may incorporate transparent SWNT electrodes.

== Hydrogen storage ==
In addition to being able to store electrical energy, there has been some research in using carbon nanotubes to store hydrogen to be used as a fuel source. By taking advantage of the capillary effects of the small carbon nanotubes, it is possible to condense gases in high density inside single-walled nanotubes. This allows for gases, most notably hydrogen (H_{2}), to be stored at high densities without being condensed into a liquid. Potentially, this storage method could be used on vehicles in place of gas fuel tanks for a hydrogen-powered car. A current issue regarding hydrogen-powered vehicles is the on-board storage of the fuel. Current storage methods involve cooling and condensing the H_{2} gas to a liquid state for storage which causes a loss of potential energy (25–45%) when compared to the energy associated with the gaseous state. Storage using SWNTs would allow one to keep the H2 in its gaseous state, thereby increasing the storage efficiency. This method allows for a volume to energy ratio slightly smaller to that of current gas powered vehicles, allowing for a slightly lower but comparable range.

An area of controversy and frequent experimentation regarding the storage of hydrogen by adsorption in carbon nanotubes is the efficiency by which this process occurs. The effectiveness of hydrogen storage is integral to its use as a primary fuel source since hydrogen only contains about one fourth the energy per unit volume as gasoline. Studies however show that what is the most important is the surface area of the materials used. Hence activated carbon with surface area of 2600 m2/g can store up to 5,8% w/w. In all these carbonaceous materials, hydrogen is stored by physisorption at 70-90K.

=== Experimental capacity ===
One experiment sought to determine the amount of hydrogen stored in CNTs by utilizing elastic recoil detection analysis (ERDA). CNTs (primarily SWNTs) were synthesized via chemical vapor disposition (CVD) and subjected to a two-stage purification process including air oxidation and acid treatment, then formed into flat, uniform discs and exposed to pure, pressurized hydrogen at various temperatures. When the data was analyzed, it was found that the ability of CNTs to store hydrogen decreased as temperature increased. Moreover, the highest hydrogen concentration measured was ~0.18%; significantly lower than commercially viable hydrogen storage needs to be. A separate experimental work performed by using a gravimetric method also revealed the maximum hydrogen uptake capacity of CNTs to be as low as 0.2%.

In another experiment, CNTs were synthesized via CVD and their structure was characterized using Raman spectroscopy. Utilizing microwave digestion, the samples were exposed to different acid concentrations and different temperatures for various amounts of time in an attempt to find the optimum purification method for SWNTs of the diameter determined earlier. The purified samples were then exposed to hydrogen gas at various high pressures, and their adsorption by weight percent was plotted. The data showed that hydrogen adsorption levels of up to 3.7% are possible with a very pure sample and under the proper conditions. It is thought that microwave digestion helps improve the hydrogen adsorption capacity of the CNTs by opening up the ends, allowing access to the inner cavities of the nanotubes.

=== Limitations on efficient hydrogen adsorption ===
The biggest obstacle to efficient hydrogen storage using CNTs is the purity of the nanotubes. To achieve maximum hydrogen adsorption, there must be minimum graphene, amorphous carbon, and metallic deposits in the nanotube sample. Current methods of CNT synthesis require a purification step. However, even with pure nanotubes, the adsorption capacity is only maximized under high pressures, which are undesirable in commercial fuel tanks.

== Electronic components ==
Various companies are developing transparent, electrically conductive CNT films and nanobuds to replace indium tin oxide (ITO) in LCDs, touch screens and photovoltaic devices. Nanotube films show promise for use in displays for computers, cell phones, Personal digital assistants, and automated teller machines. CNT diodes display a photovoltaic effect.

Multi-walled nanotubes (MWNT coated with magnetite) can generate strong magnetic fields. Recent advances show that MWNT decorated with maghemite nanoparticles can be oriented in a magnetic field and enhance the electrical properties of the composite material in the direction of the field for use in electric motor brushes.

A layer of 29% iron enriched single-walled nanotubes (SWNT) placed on top of a layer of explosive material such as PETN can be ignited with a regular camera flash.

CNTs can be used as electron guns in miniature cathode ray tubes (CRT) in high-brightness, low-energy, low-weight displays. A display would consist of a group of tiny CRTs, each providing the electrons to illuminate the phosphor of one pixel, instead of having one CRT whose electrons are aimed using electric and magnetic fields. These displays are known as field emission displays (FEDs).

CNTs can act as antennas for radios and other electromagnetic devices.

Conductive CNTs are used in brushes for commercial electric motors. They replace traditional carbon black. The nanotubes improve electrical and thermal conductivity because they stretch through the plastic matrix of the brush. This permits the carbon filler to be reduced from 30% down to 3.6%, so that more matrix is present in the brush. Nanotube composite motor brushes are better-lubricated (from the matrix), cooler-running (both from better lubrication and superior thermal conductivity), less brittle (more matrix, and fiber reinforcement), stronger and more accurately moldable (more matrix). Since brushes are a critical failure point in electric motors, and also don't need much material, they became economical before almost any other application.

Wires for carrying electric current may be fabricated from nanotubes and nanotube-polymer composites. Small wires have been fabricated with specific conductivity exceeding copper and aluminum; the highest conductivity non-metallic cables. For example, carbon nanotubes guarantee electrical conductivity of 100 MS/m, greater than aluminum or copper, which have conductivities of 35 and 59.6 MS/m, respectively.

CNT are under investigation as an alternative to tungsten filaments in incandescent light bulbs.

=== Interconnects ===
Metallic carbon nanotubes have aroused research interest for their applicability as very-large-scale integration (VLSI) interconnects because of their high thermal stability, high thermal conductivity and large current carrying capacity. An isolated CNT can carry current densities in excess of 1000 MA/cm^{2} without damage even at an elevated temperature of 250 °C (482 °F), eliminating electromigration reliability concerns that plague Cu interconnects. Recent modeling work comparing the two has shown that CNT bundle interconnects can potentially offer advantages over copper. Recent experiments demonstrated resistances as low as 20 Ohms using different architectures, detailed conductance measurements over a wide temperature range were shown to agree with theory for a strongly disordered quasi-one-dimensional conductor.

Hybrid interconnects that employ CNT vias in tandem with copper interconnects may offer advantages from a reliability/thermal-management perspective. In 2016, the European Union has funded a four million euro project over three years to evaluate manufacturability and performance of composite interconnects employing both CNT and copper interconnects. The project named CONNECT (CarbON Nanotube compositE InterconneCTs) involves the joint efforts of seven European research and industry partners on fabrication techniques and processes to enable reliable Carbon NanoTubes for on-chip interconnects in ULSI microchip production.

=== Electrical cables and wires ===
Wires for carrying electric current may be fabricated from pure nanotubes and nanotube-polymer composites. It has already been demonstrated that carbon nanotube wires can successfully be used for power or data transmission. Recently small wires have been fabricated with specific conductivity exceeding copper and aluminum; these cables are the highest conductivity carbon nanotube and also highest conductivity non-metal cables. Recently, composite of carbon nanotube and copper have been shown to exhibit nearly one hundred times higher current-carrying-capacity than pure copper or gold. Significantly, the electrical conductivity of such a composite is similar to pure Cu. Thus, this Carbon nanotube-copper (CNT-Cu) composite possesses the highest observed current-carrying capacity among electrical conductors. Thus for a given cross-section of electrical conductor, the CNT-Cu composite can withstand and transport one hundred times higher current compared to metals such as copper and gold.

== Energy storages behind CNT ==
The use of CNTs as a catalyst support in fuel cells can potentially reduce platinum usage by 60% compared with carbon black. Doped CNTs may enable the complete elimination of Pt.

=== Supercapacitor ===
MIT Research Laboratory of Electronics uses nanotubes to improve supercapacitors. The activated charcoal used in conventional ultracapacitors has many small hollow spaces of various size, which create together a large surface to store electric charge. But as charge is quantized into elementary charges, i.e. electrons, and each such elementary charge needs a minimum space, a significant fraction of the electrode surface is not available for storage because the hollow spaces are not compatible with the charge's requirements. With a nanotube electrode the spaces may be tailored to size—few too large or too small—and consequently the capacity should be increased considerably.

A 40-F supercapacitor with a maximum voltage of 3.5 V that employed forest-grown SWNTs that are binder- and additive-free achieved an energy density of 15.6 Wh kg^{−1} and a power density of 37 kW kg^{−1}. CNTs can be bound to the charge plates of capacitors to dramatically increase the surface area and therefore energy density.

=== Batteries ===
Carbon nanotubes' (CNTs) exciting electronic properties have shown promise in the field of batteries, where typically they are being experimented as a new electrode material, particularly the anode for lithium-ion batteries. This is due to the fact that the anode requires a relatively high reversible capacity at a potential close to metallic lithium, and a moderate irreversible capacity, observed thus far only by graphite-based composites, such as CNTs. They have shown to greatly improve capacity and cyclability of lithium-ion batteries, as well as the capability to be very effective buffering components, alleviating the degradation of the batteries that is typically due to repeated charging and discharging. Further, electronic transport in the anode can be greatly improved using highly metallic CNTs.

More specifically, CNTs have shown reversible capacities from 300 to 600 mAhg^{−1}, with some treatments to them showing these numbers rise to up to 1000 mAhg^{−1}. Meanwhile, graphite, which is most widely used as an anode material for these lithium batteries, has shown capacities of only 320 mAhg^{−1}. By creating composites out of the CNTs, scientists see much potential in taking advantage of these exceptional capacities, as well as their excellent mechanical strength, conductivities, and low densities.

MWNTs are used in lithium ion batteries cathodes. In these batteries, small amounts of MWNT powder are blended with active materials and a polymer binder, such as 1 wt % CNT loading in LiCoO_{2} cathodes and graphite anodes. CNTs provide increased electrical connectivity and mechanical integrity, which enhances rate capability and cycle life.

==== Paper batteries ====
A paper battery is a battery engineered to use a paper-thin sheet of cellulose (which is the major constituent of regular paper, among other things) infused with aligned carbon nanotubes. The potential for these devices is great, as they may be manufactured via a roll-to-roll process, which would make it very low-cost, and they would be lightweight, flexible, and thin. In order to productively use paper electronics (or any thin electronic devices), the power source must be equally thin, thus indicating the need for paper batteries. Recently, it has been shown that surfaces coated with CNTs can be used to replace heavy metals in batteries. More recently, functional paper batteries have been demonstrated, where a lithium-ion battery is integrated on a single sheet of paper through a lamination process as a composite with Li_{4}Ti5O_{12} (LTO) or LiCoO_{2} (LCO). The paper substrate would function well as the separator for the battery, where the CNT films function as the current collectors for both the anode and the cathode. These rechargeable energy devices show potential in RFID tags, functional packaging, or new disposable electronic applications.

Improvements have also been shown in lead-acid batteries, based on research performed by Bar-Ilan University using high quality SWCNT manufactured by OCSiAl. The study demonstrated an increase in the lifetime of lead acid batteries by 4.5 times and a capacity increase of 30% on average and up to 200% at high discharge rates.

== Chemical ==
CNT can be used for water transport and desalination. Water molecules can be separated from salt by forcing them through electrochemically robust nanotube networks with controlled nanoscale porosity. This process requires far lower pressures than conventional reverse osmosis methods. Compared to a plain membrane, it operates at a 20 °C lower temperature, and at a 6x greater flow rate. Membranes using aligned, encapsulated CNTs with open ends permit flow through the CNTs' interiors. Very-small-diameter SWNTs are needed to reject salt at seawater concentrations. Portable filters containing CNT meshes can purify contaminated drinking water. Such networks can electrochemically oxidize organic contaminants, bacteria and viruses.

CNT membranes can filter carbon dioxide from power plant emissions.

CNT can be filled with biological molecules, aiding biotechnology.

CNT have the potential to store between 4.2 and 65% hydrogen by weight. If they can be mass-produced economically, 13.2 litres (2.9 imp gal; 3.5 US gal) of CNT could contain the same amount of energy as a 50 litres (11 imp gal; 13 US gal) gasoline tank.

CNTs can be used to produce nanowires of other elements/molecules, such as gold or zinc oxide. Nanowires in turn can be used to cast nanotubes of other materials, such as gallium nitride. These can have very different properties from CNTs—for example, gallium nitride nanotubes are hydrophilic, while CNTs are hydrophobic, giving them possible uses in organic chemistry.

== Mechanical ==
Oscillators based on CNT have achieved speeds of > 50 GHz.

CNT electrical and mechanical properties suggest them as alternatives to traditional electrical actuators.

=== Actuators ===
Owing to their superior electromechanical properties, carbon nanotubes (CNTs) have emerged as viable alternatives to conventional electrical actuators across both microscopic and macroscopic domains. Characterized by exceptional thermal and electrical conductivities, alongside high tensile strength and anisotropic elasticity, CNTs demonstrate significant efficacy in advanced actuation technologies.

=== Loudspeaker ===
Carbon nanotubes have also been applied in the acoustics (such as loudspeaker and earphone). In 2008, it was shown that a sheet of nanotubes can operate as a loudspeaker if an alternating current is applied. The sound is not produced through vibration but thermoacoustically. In 2013, a carbon nanotube (CNT) thin yarn thermoacoustic earphone together with CNT thin yarn thermoacoustic chip was demonstrated by a research group of Tsinghua-Foxconn Nanotechnology Research Center in Tsinghua University, using a Si-based semi-conducting technology compatible fabrication process.

Near-term commercial uses include replacing piezoelectric speakers in greeting cards.

== Optical ==
See additional applications in: Optical properties of carbon nanotubes

- Carbon nanotube photoluminescence (fluorescence) can be used to observe semiconducting single-walled carbon nanotube species. Photoluminescence maps, made by acquiring the emission and scanning the excitation energy, can facilitate sample characterization.
- Nanotube fluorescence is under investigation for biomedical imaging and sensors.
- The reflectivity of buckypaper produced with "super-growth" chemical vapor deposition is 0.03 or less, potentially enabling performance gains for pyroelectric infrared detectors.

== Environmental ==
=== Environmental remediation ===
A CNT nano-structured sponge (nanosponge) containing sulfur and iron is more effective at soaking up water contaminants such as oil, fertilizers, pesticides and pharmaceuticals. Their magnetic properties make them easier to retrieve once the clean-up job is done. The sulfur and iron increases sponge size to around 2 centimetres (0.79 in). It also increases porosity due to beneficial defects, creating buoyancy and reusability. Iron, in the form of ferrocene makes the structure easier to control and enables recovery using magnets. Such nanosponges increase the absorption of the toxic organic solvent dichlorobenzene from water by 3.5 times. The sponges can absorb vegetable oil up to 150 times their initial weight and can absorb engine oil as well.

Earlier, a magnetic boron-doped MWNT nanosponge that could absorb oil from water. The sponge was grown as a forest on a substrate via chemical vapor disposition. Boron puts kinks and elbows into the tubes as they grow and promotes the formation of covalent bonds. The nanosponges retain their elastic property after 10,000 compressions in the lab. The sponges are both superhydrophobic, forcing them to remain at the water's surface and oleophilic, drawing oil to them.

=== Water treatment ===
It has been shown that carbon nanotubes exhibit strong adsorption affinities to a wide range of aromatic and aliphatic contaminants in water, due to their large and hydrophobic surface areas. They also showed similar adsorption capacities as activated carbons in the presence of natural organic matter. As a result, they have been suggested as promising adsorbents for removal of contaminant in water and wastewater treatment systems.

Moreover, membranes made out of carbon nanotube arrays have been suggested as switchable molecular sieves, with sieving and permeation features that can be dynamically activated/deactivated by either pore size distribution (passive control) or external electrostatic fields (active control).

== Other applications ==
Carbon nanotubes have been implemented in nanoelectromechanical systems, including mechanical memory elements (NRAM being developed by Nantero Inc.) and nanoscale electric motors (see Nanomotor or Nanotube nanomotor).

Carboxyl-modified single-walled carbon nanotubes (so called zig-zag, armchair type) can act as sensors of atoms and ions of alkali metals Na, Li, K. In May 2005, Nanomix Inc. placed on the market a hydrogen sensor that integrated carbon nanotubes on a silicon platform.

Eikos Inc of Franklin, Massachusetts and Unidym Inc. of Silicon Valley, California are developing transparent, electrically conductive films of carbon nanotubes to replace indium tin oxide (ITO). Carbon nanotube films are substantially more mechanically robust than ITO films, making them ideal for high-reliability touchscreens and flexible displays. Printable water-based inks of carbon nanotubes are desired to enable the production of these films to replace ITO. Nanotube films show promise for use in displays for computers, cell phones, PDAs, and ATMs.

A nanoradio, a radio receiver consisting of a single nanotube, was demonstrated in 2007.

The use in tensile stress or toxic gas sensors was proposed by Tsagarakis.

A flywheel made of carbon nanotubes could be spun at extremely high velocity on a floating magnetic axis in a vacuum, and potentially store energy at a density approaching that of conventional fossil fuels. Since energy can be added to and removed from flywheels very efficiently in the form of electricity, this might offer a way of storing electricity, making the electrical grid more efficient and variable power suppliers (like wind turbines) more useful in meeting energy needs. The practicality of this depends heavily upon the cost of making massive, unbroken nanotube structures, and their failure rate under stress.

Carbon nanotube springs have the potential to indefinitely store elastic potential energy at ten times the density of lithium-ion batteries with flexible charge and discharge rates and extremely high cycling durability.

Ultra-short SWNTs (US-tubes) have been used as nanoscaled capsules for delivering MRI contrast agents in vivo.

Carbon nanotubes provide a certain potential for metal-free catalysis of inorganic and organic reactions. For instance, oxygen groups attached to the surface of carbon nanotubes have the potential to catalyze oxidative dehydrogenations or selective oxidations. Nitrogen-doped carbon nanotubes may replace platinum catalysts used to reduce oxygen in fuel cells. A forest of vertically aligned nanotubes can reduce oxygen in alkaline solution more effectively than platinum, which has been used in such applications since the 1960s. Here, the nanotubes have the added benefit of not being subject to carbon monoxide poisoning.

Wake Forest University engineers are using multiwalled carbon nanotubes to enhance the brightness of field-induced polymer electroluminescent technology, potentially offering a step forward in the search for safe, pleasing, high-efficiency lighting. In this technology, moldable polymer matrix emits light when exposed to an electric current. It could eventually yield high-efficiency lights without the mercury vapor of compact fluorescent lamps or the bluish tint of some fluorescents and LEDs, which has been linked with circadian rhythm disruption.

Candida albicans has been used in combination with carbon nanotubes (CNT) to produce stable electrically conductive bio-nano-composite tissue materials that have been used as temperature sensing elements.

The SWNT production company OCSiAl developed a series of masterbatches for industrial use of single-wall CNTs in multiple types of rubber blends and tires, with initial trials showing increases in hardness, viscosity, tensile strain resistance and resistance to abrasion while reducing elongation and compression In tires the three primary characteristics of durability, fuel efficiency and traction were improved using SWNTs. The development of rubber masterbatches built on earlier work by the Japanese National Institute of Advanced Industrial Science & Technology showing rubber to be a viable candidate for improvement with SWNTs.

Introducing MWNTs to polymers can improve flame retardancy and retard thermal degradation of polymer. The results confirmed that combination of MWNTs and ammonium polyphosphates show a synergistic effect for improving flame retardancy.
