= Robert L. McGinnis =

American scientist

- Born: Robert Lloyd McGinnis
- Education: Yale University
- Occupations: scientist, inventor, technology entrepreneur
- Years active: 2002 - Present
- Known for: Prometheus Fuels, Mattershift and Oasys Water
- Notable work: NH_{3}/CO_{2} draw solution for the forward osmosis process

Robert L. McGinnis is an American scientist, technology entrepreneur, and inventor who has founded a number of technology companies including Prometheus Fuels, Mattershift and Oasys Water.

As a scientist, McGinnis is known for his contributions in the domain of desalination and forward osmosis; in particular he is credited as a co-inventor of the NH_{3}/CO_{2} draw solution for the forward osmosis (FO) desalination process.

McGinnis is CEO at Prometheus Fuels, an environmental technology startup company he founded in 2019.

== Background ==
Robert McGinnis attended Cabrillo College and then Yale University, where he received his B.A. degree in Theater in 2002. He then earned an M.S. in Environmental Engineering in 2007. Continuing his studies at Yale University, McGinnis finished his Ph.D. in Environmental Engineering in 2009; his academic advisor was Menachem Elimelech. His joint work and thesis " Ammonia – Carbon Dioxide Forward Osmosis Desalination and Pressure Retarded Osmosis" was published in the journal "Desalination" in April 2005.

McGinnis is a veteran of the U.S. Navy Explosive Ordnance Disposal (EOD) team, where he also served during Operation Desert Storm defusing mines in the Persian Gulf's harbors and battlefields.

== Academic career ==
In 2002, McGinnis was assigned as CTO and research engineer at Osmotic Technologies Inc., (OTI), a Yale University Incubator for commercialization of forward osmosis desalination and water treatment, which later became a pilot project under the auspices of EUWP program (Expeditionary Unit Water Purification Consortium). In 2006, McGinnis received an NSF-GRFP Graduate Research Fellowship from the National Science Foundation for his Ph.D. studies under the supervision of Menachem Elimelech, who founded Yale's Environmental Engineering Program.

McGinnis' scientific research interests at Yale included the development of osmotically driven membrane processes, novel membrane design, and nanoscale membrane sensing with the main focus being on engineered forward osmosis methods and its practical applications in desalination and water treatment processes.

His work has been published in chemistry and environment technology-related journals. McGinnis is also co-inventor on more than 20 granted patents in the fields of membranes, energy, desalination, and nanotechnology assigned by the United States Patent and Trademark Office. In 2018, McGinnis received an AIChE Innovator Award for Innovation in Chemical Engineering Education granted by the American Institute of Chemical Engineers (AIChE).

== Business career ==
=== Oasys Water ===
The research of forward osmosis methods in Elimelech's lab at Yale led to the formation of Oasys Water in 2008, a company based in Cambridge, Massachusetts, with the main purpose of making the technology of functional desalination systems called engineered osmosis (EO) commercially applicable. The company sprang out as Yale's technology startup project. McGinnis directed the company as CTO until 2012. Eventually, Oasys Water built five large water treatment plants in China and was later merged with Beijing-based Woteer Water Technology company.

=== Mattershift ===
In 2013, McGinnis launched Mattershift, a technology company developing carbon nanotube membranes for molecular factories. The company further sought to convert CO_{2} from the air into fuels, fertilizers, pharmaceuticals, and construction materials without the use of fossil fuels. The San Francisco Bay Area-based company was initially located at the University of Connecticut (UCONN) as part of its Technology Incubation Program.

The company's technology in scaling up carbon nanotube (CNT) membranes was published and peer-reviewed in Science Advances in March 2018. The open-access study was also reviewed by The Chemical Engineer.

=== Prometheus Fuels ===
McGinnis founded his next technology startup company, Santa Cruz, California-based, Prometheus Fuels, an energy startup developing tools to filter atmospheric CO_{2} using water, electricity, and nanotube membranes to produce commercially viable fuels. He started the company in 2019 and has been CEO since then. The project was one of two selected for investment in March 2019 by Y Combinator after the incubator's request for proposals to address carbon removal.

== Selected publications ==
- Robert L. McGinnis; Kevin Reimund; Jian Ren; Lingling Xia and others, Large-scale polymeric carbon nanotube membranes with sub–1.27-nm pores, in Science Advances, Vol 4, Issue 3, 2018
- Robert L. McGinnis; Nathan T. Hancock; Marek S. Nowosielski-Slepowron; Gary D. McGurgan2, Pilot demonstration of the NH_{3}/CO_{2} forward osmosis desalination process on high salinity brines, in Desalination Journal, Volume 312, 1 March 2013, Pages 67–74
- Robert L. McGinnis; Tzahi Y. Catha; Menachem Elimelech; Jeffrey R. McCutcheon and others, Standard Methodology for Evaluating Membrane Performance in Osmotically Driven Membrane Processes, in Desalination Journal, Volume 312, 1 March 2013, Pages 31–38
- Robert L. McGinnis and Menachem Elimelech, Global Challenges in Energy and Water Supply: The Promise of Engineered Osmosis in Environ. Sci. Technol. 2008, 42, 23, 8625–8629, 1 December 2008
- Robert L. McGinnis; Jeffrey R. McCutcheon; Menachem Elimelech, A novel ammonia–carbon dioxide osmotic heat engine for power generation, in Journal of Membrane Science, Volume 305, Issues 1–2, 15 November 2007, Pages 13–19
- Robert L. McGinnis; Menachem Elimelech, Energy requirements of ammonia–carbon dioxide forward osmosis desalination, in Desalination Journal, Volume 207, Issues 1–3, 10 March 2007, Pages 370-382
- Robert L. McGinnis; Jeffrey R. McCutcheon; Menachem Elimelech, Desalination by ammonia–carbon dioxide forward osmosis: Influence of draw and feed solution concentrations on process performance, in Journal of Membrane Science, Volume 278, Issues 1–2, 5 July 2006, Pages 114-123
- Robert L. McGinnis; Jeffrey L. McCutcheon and Menachem Elimelech, The Ammonia-Carbon Dioxide Forward Osmosis Desalination Process, in Water Conditioning and Purification, Jan 1, 2006
- Robert L. McGinnis; Jeffrey R. McCutcheon; Menachem Elimelech, A novel ammonia—carbon dioxide forward (direct) osmosis desalination process, in Desalination Journal, Volume 174, Issue 1, 1 April 2005, Pages 1–11

== See also ==
- Forward osmosis
- Desalination
