= Prometheus Fuels =

Carbon-neutral fuel manufacturer

- Company type: Private
- Industry: Carbon-neutral fuels, carbon capture and storage, environmental services
- Founded: 2019
- Founder: Rob McGinnis
- Headquarters: Santa Cruz, California, USA
- Products: Zero-net-carbon gasoline and jet fuels
- Website: PrometheusFuels.com

Prometheus Fuels is an American energy startup developing tools to filter atmospheric CO_{2} using water, electricity, and nanotube membranes to produce commercially viable fuels. When powered by renewable electricity sources, e-fuels produced by such direct air capture methods do not contribute further emissions, making them carbon-neutral. The project was one of two selected for investment in March 2019 by Y Combinator, a prominent Silicon Valley business incubator, after requesting proposals which address carbon removal.

The process uses a solution of liquid water and CO_{2} that is exposed to an electrified copper plate. This catalyzes a reaction and produces fuel alcohols (mostly ethanol). Closely packed filters made from cylindrical carbon nanotubes embedded in plastic allow ethanol through while blocking water molecules. From there, the more concentrated solution of approximately 95% ethanol can be catalyzed with zeolite to join into more complex hydrocarbons, including gasoline, diesel, or jet fuel. This technique works at room temperature, while traditional methods of extraction require heat to distill it from a solution. Founder Rob McGinnis speculated that even though the theoretical efficiency of Prometheus' system was only 50–60%, their less energy-intensive process could nevertheless considerably lower overall cost and be competitive with fossil fuels.

In June 2020, BMW announced an investment of US$12.5 million into Prometheus Fuels. A section of the official BMW website declared that "By perfecting existing chemical reactions and processes, Prometheus will make drop-in replacement fuels that are guilt-free. Prometheus will help to fuel the power of choice." A Norwegian investment firm called Tjuvholmen Ventures that has invested in a small assortment of green energy companies has also invested in Prometheus Fuels.
