= Carbon nanotubes for water transport =

Water shortages have become an increasingly pressing concern recently and with recent predictions of a high probability of the current drought turning into a megadrought occurring in the western United States, technologies involving water treatment and processing need to improve. Carbon nanotubes (CNT) have been the subject of extensive studies because they demonstrate a range of unique properties that existing technologies lack. For example, carbon nanotube membranes can demonstrate higher water flux with lower energy than current membranes. These membranes can also filter out particles that are too small for conventional systems which can lead to better water purification techniques and less waste. The largest obstacle facing CNT is processing as it is difficult to produce them in the large quantities that most of these technologies will require.

== Basic Information ==
There are two main types of membrane that can be manufactured: ones with vertically aligned CNT and ones with more randomly arranged CNT. Ideally the membrane would be composed of vertically aligned CNT as this would produce the greatest flux through the membrane but producing this pattern is incredibly difficult. The easier method is to produce a randomly arranged membrane with the drawback that it will not perform as well as the aligned. Other important factors to consider in processing are the tube diameter and length, density of the CNT (how closely packed) and what (if any) filler will be used.

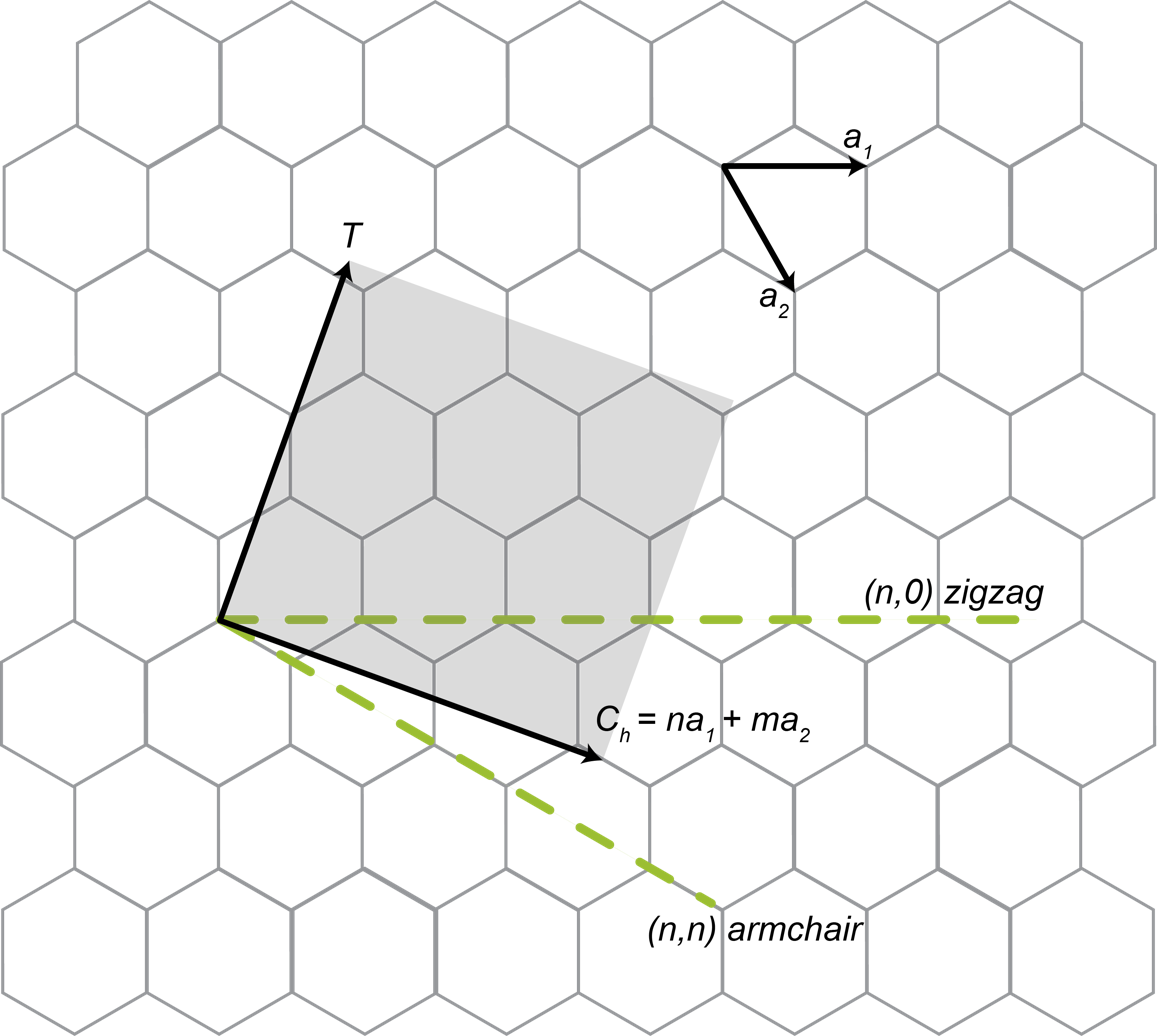
Letters (n, m) indicate the number of unit vectors in an infinite graphene sheet and Ch is a ‘rolled up’ vector. T denotes the tube axis, and a1 and a2 are the unit vectors of graphene. If m = 0, the CNTs are called ‘zigzag’, and when n = m, the CNTs are called ‘armchair’. Otherwise, the CNTs are simply ‘chiral’.

The hydrophobic walls of the carbon nanotubes accelerate the flow of water molecules through the tube as they "slip" whenever they come in contact with the walls. The water molecules are driven through the pores by a pressure difference created by a pump. As the molecules begin to travel through the tube, they form a chain like network with one another due to the strong hydrogen bonding present. This facilitates the flow of water through the tubes as well as making a molecule pulled forward by the one in front of it. The water can also flow down the outer surface of the tubes, but flow through the inside of the tubes is the fastest. This system is thought to be useful in water purification and desalination because of the accelerated water flow, as well as the nanotubes' ion-exclusion properties. Ions are excluded by functionalizing the ends of the nanotubes, as well as by tube diameter.

== Surface Chemistry ==
=== Nanoconfined Water ===
While the carbon nanotubes are non-polar and therefore relatively hydrophobic, water spontaneously fills them at ~8-10% humidity. The understood filling mechanism depends on the solvent’s polarity, ion concentration, and the van der Waals forces between the water and the CNT. When water in the interior of the CNT can have a lower chemical potential than it would in the bulk, it fills the CNT. Even non-polar materials are polarizable. This polarizability allows for van der Waals forces between the water and the membrane walls, attracting the water molecules into the CNT.

==== Water Alignment into Single Chains ====
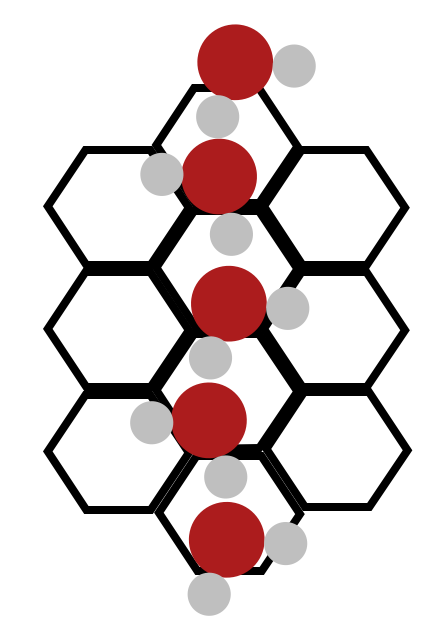
"Wires" of water inside a carbon nanotube, held together by hydrogen bonds between water molecules, and ordered by van der Waals forces between water molecules and the CNT wall.

Inside the CNT, the water is “nanoconfined”, or contained in a nano-scale volume. This nanoconfinement organizes the water molecules into H-bond connected “wires”, lowering the chemical potential energy of the water inside the nanotube. The carbon-water interactions makes these wires the most favorable state, as long as the van der Waals forces stay above a certain level. In the ideal wire formation, each water molecule’s dipole moment parallels the CNT axis, where it has the lowest potential. This orientation has the lowest potential because it is where the water molecule’s dipole moment interacts the least with the non-polar CNT wall. In addition to van der Waals forces lowering chemical potential, external pressure can also influence the CNT membranes to fill. Pressure does not increase the chemical potential inside the CNTs, but it increases it in the bulk material (100 MPa causes a ~2 kJ/mol increase). This makes the CNT interior relatively more favorable for the water, pushing them towards full.

==== Diameter and Ion Exclusivity ====
The water “wires” increase the water flux, since their ordering reduces the amount molecules can run into each other due to Brownian motion. These chains “densely fill” CNTs less than 1 nm wide and up to 0.1 mm long, forming a system that can mediate proton transfer. While they are highly ordered, the small number of molecules forming a chain prevents the decrease in entropy from being prohibitive, and it costs too much energy to insert a dipole-orientation defect. In these systems, many ions are simply too big to fit through the CNT membrane because their hydration shell’s diameter exceeds that of the CNT. Some ions can be drawn through by charging the membrane.

=== Mathematical Modeling ===
Transport of water molecules through a capillary can often be quantified using the Hagen-Poiseuille equation for continuum flow. However, the transport of water molecules through a CNT follows the transport phenomenon known as “nanofluidics”. This phenomenon is due to the extremely high aspect ratios, molecularly smooth hydrophobic graphitic walls, and nanoscale inner diameters of carbon nanotubes. This phenomenon allows water and gas molecules to move through nanotube pores orders of magnitudes faster than through other pores of comparable size. This theory assumes that the fluid flowing through a nano-channel has a frictionless slip length. Using the no-slip condition, we can model volumetric flow rate using a form of the Hagen-Poiseuille that accounts for a frictionless slip length which is shown below.

$Q_{{slip}} = \frac{\pi\left(\tfrac{d}{2}\right)^4 + 4\left(\tfrac{d}{2}\right)^3 \cdot L(s) }{8\mu} \cdot \frac{\Delta P}{L}$

Where:

$Q_{{slip}}$ represents the water flux
$d$ represents the diameter of the nano-channel
$\Delta P$ is the pressure difference between both ends of the nano-channel
$\mu$ represents the viscosity of water, and
$L$ represents the length of the nano-channel

The slip length (Ls(d)) can be calculated using the following equation,

$L_s (d) = L_{s \infty} + \frac{C}{d^3}$

Where:

$L_{s \infty}$ represents the slip length of the surface (assumed 30 nm) and
$C$ is a fitting parameter

== Applications ==
=== Desalination ===
Carbon nanotubes are being investigated for use in desalination due to their ion exclusion properties. This is largely due to the unfavorable energy barrier that would have to be overcome in order to desolvate the ions, as the hydrated ions are often larger than the diameter of the nanotubes. As the diameter of the tube increases, larger and larger ions will be allowed to pass through. Another way to select for a type of ion is to create a charged environment inside the nanotube, to decrease the energy penalty of desolvation for the selected ion. This can be done by incorporating oppositely charged functional groups into the carbon nanotube. This also increases the energy barrier for the oppositely charged ions when compared to the selected ion.

==== Major Factors Determining Desalination Potential ====
The inner diameter of the nanotube largely contributes to the ion exclusion properties of the nanotube. As shown below, an increase from 0.32 (nm) to 0.75 (nm) caused a 42% decrease in salt rejection percentage. On the other hand, a larger inner diameter provides a corresponding increase in flow rate. Upon the same increase in inner diameter, the flow rate increased from 66.7 (LMH) to 270.8 (LMH). This demonstrates the tradeoff that exists between the degree of ion exclusion and the rate of water transport through a membrane.

Salt rejection efficiencies and flow rates of the vertically aligned CNT membranes based on molecular dynamic simulation [a]
Rolled up vector	Inner diameter (nm)	Salt rejection (%)	Flow rate (LMH) [b]	Enhancement [c]
(5,5)	0.32	100	66.7	2.42
(6,6)	0.49	100	112.5	4.21
(7,7)	0.59	95	175.0	6.39
(8,8)	0.75	58	270.8	9.76

[a] Assuming an operating pressure of 5.5 MPa and allow for an osmotic pressure of 2.4 MPa. CNT density of the membrane was assumed to be 2.5 × 10^{11} CNT cm^{−2}. [b] LMH = L*m^{−2}*h^{−1} [c] Enhancement ratios are estimated relatively to the published values for a FILMTECH SW30H4-380 commercial reverse osmosis membrane.

==== Projecting Performances of CNT Membranes ====
The efficiency of membrane permeability and salt rejection can be negatively affected by biofouling. Biofouling is detrimental to the concentration polarization within the biofilm which causes an increase in the operation cost of the CNT membrane.

In tandem with nano-scale particulate, studies have demonstrated CNTs can cause damage to microbial cell walls and kill bacteria. Single-walled nanotubes tend to exhibit more antimicrobial behavior than multi-walled and double-walled nanotubes and inhibits the formation of biofilms, the first stage of biological fouling. Therefore, the anti-biofouling surface of CNT membranes may require less maintenance than traditional nanofiltration and reverse osmosis membranes.

The entropy driven nature of nanofluidics gives CNT membranes a very low energy consumption requirement. CNT membrane processes are able to be utilized without the use of an energy intensive high pressure pump, a very significant advantage over nanofiltration and reverse osmosis processes.

==== Practical Targets for CNT Membranes ====
Molecular dynamics simulations in tandem with data reporting from scientific literature shows that typical CNT fluxes range from about 70 to 270 LMH. Therefore, a theoretical water flux of 10-15 LMH/bar can be reached on vertically aligned CNTs, a fivefold increase over traditional brackish water reverse osmosis plants. Mixed nanotube membranes such as double-walled-nanotubes/polyacrylate have a flux of about 4.05 LMH/bar, 1.5 times greater than brackish water reverse osmosis. Extremely high levels of flux have been reported in multiwalled-nanotube/polysulfone mixtures, though the exact H_{2}O transport mechanism is still unknown. Vertically aligned CNT membranes are projected to have salt rejection efficiencies approaching those of brackish water reverse osmosis, so long as nanotubes with an inner diameter of less than 1 nanometer are used in tandem with a maximized surface charge through various functional group and polymeric surface modifications.

=== Wastewater Treatment ===
CNTs exhibit various qualities that make them useful for wastewater treatment, including their ability to selectively filter extremely small particles, as well as their unique ability as adsorbents due to their relative chemical, mechanical and thermal stability. CNT Membranes show a particular affinity for adsorption by heavy metals ions such as Zn^{2+}, which is toxic to aquatic organisms and has a tendency to quickly bio-accumulate. Comparisons of adsorption rates for zinc ions of CNTs vs. other materials such as commercially available PAC were very favorable, and the reusability of CNTs was additionally shown to be reversible in the presence of dilute nitric acid, and reusable for 10 cycles of adsorption and deadsorption. CNT filtration has also been shown to adsorb other heavy metals such as Nickel, Lead, Cadmium, Chromium and Copper.

==== CNT Coulter Counters ====
In addition to removing small particles, there is potential for utilizing the uniquely consistent and quantifiable dimensions of Carbon Nanotubes as devices known as Coulter counters. Coulter Counters quantify the passage of objects through a pore by measuring a voltage difference, which is proportional to the size of the object in most cases. CNTs and CNT Membranes can be particularly useful in this regard because of their ability to be constructed into nanopore arrays, with CNTs implemented into matrices such as epoxy in relatively uniform distribution. The construction of single-nanopore membranes is also possible, allowing scientists to study analogues of mass transport of such things as drugs, viruses and genes through a cellular matrix, for example. CNT membranes could also potentially help detect minute amounts of toxins or chemicals in wastewater samples.

== See also ==
- Carbon Nanotubes
- Carbon Nanotube Membranes
- Reverse Osmosis
- Desalination
