= Strip algebra =

Strip Algebra is a set of elements and operators for the description of carbon nanotube structures, considered as a subgroup of polyhedra, and more precisely, of polyhedra with vertices formed by three edges. This restriction is imposed on the polyhedra because carbon nanotubes are formed of sp2 carbon atoms. Strip Algebra was developed initially for the determination of the structure connecting two arbitrary nanotubes, but has also been extended to the connection of three identical nanotubes

== Background ==
Graphitic systems are molecules and crystals formed of carbon atoms in sp2 hybridization. Thus, the atoms are arranged on a hexagonal grid. Graphite, nanotubes, and fullerenes are examples of graphitic systems. All of them share the property that each atom is bonded to three others (3-valent).

The relation between the number of vertices, edges and faces of any finite polyhedron is given by Euler's polyhedron formula:

$$e - f - v = 2 (g -1),\,$$

where e, f and v are the number of edges, faces and vertices, respectively, and g is the genus of the polyhedron, i.e., the number of "holes" in the surface. For example, a sphere is a surface of genus 0, while a torus is of genus 1.

== Nomenclature ==
A substrip is identified by a pair of natural numbers measuring the position of the last ring in parentheses, together with the turns induced by the defect ring. The number of edges of the defect can be extracted from these.

$$(n,m) [T_+,T_-]$$

== Elements ==
A Strip is defined as a set of consecutive rings, that is able to be joined with others, by sharing a side of the first or last ring.

Numerous complex structures can be formed with strips. As said before, strips have both at the beginning and at the end two connections. With strips only, can be formed two of them.

== Operators ==
Given the definition of a strip, a set of operations may be defined. These are necessary to find out the combined result of a set of contiguous strips.

- Addition of two strips: (upcoming)
- Turn Operators: (upcoming)
- Inversion of a strip: (upcoming)

== Applications ==
- Strip Algebra has been applied to the construction of nanotube heterojunctions, and was first implemented in the CoNTub v1.0 software, which makes it possible to find the precise position of all the carbon rings needed to produce a heterojunction with arbitrary indices and chirality from two nanotubes.
