= OCSiAl =

Luxembourg-based graphene nanotube manufacturer

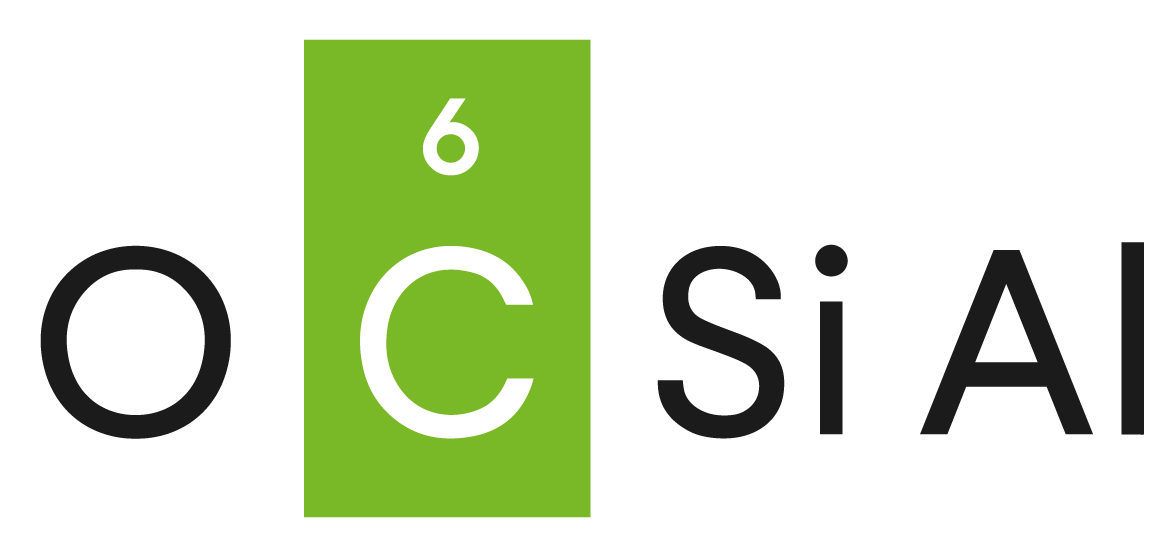
- Type: Private
- Industry: Nanotechnology; Materials science
- Founded: 2010
- Headquarters: Luxembourg
- Area served: Europe, the U.S., South Korea, China, Hong Kong, Canada, Mexico, Malaysia, Taiwan, Japan, and India
- Products: Graphene nanotubes or Single-walled carbon nanotubes
- Website: ocsial.com

OCSiAl is a Luxembourgish nanotechnology company based in Leudelange. It specializes in the production of graphene nanotubes, also known as single-walled carbon nanotubes (SWCNTs), and graphene nanotube-based products, and is considered the largest producer in the world.

== History ==
OCSiAl was founded in 2010 (Note: Luxemburger Wort names 2009 as the year of foundation.) in Novosibirsk by Russian physicists Yuri Koropachinsky, Oleg Kirillov, Yuri Zelvensky, and Mikhail Predtechensky. The name OCSiAl is derived from the chemical symbols for oxygen (O), carbon (C), silicon (Si), and aluminium (Al).

In 2014, Frost & Sullivan recognized OCSiAl with the North American Award for Technology Innovation for its SWCNT products.

In 2015, the U.S. National Nanotechnology Initiative recognized OCSiAl for expanding its matching grant program (iNanoComm), which supports research into SWCNT applications.

In 2016, OCSiAl registered OCSiAl’s SWCNTs under the European Union's REACH regulations, initially allowing production and commercialization of up to 10 tonnes annually. The capacity was increased to 100 tonnes annually in 2020, and by the end of 2025 OCSiAl is still the only company permitted at this volume.

In 2019, OCSiAl became a unicorn with a valuation exceeding $1 billion. In the same year, OCSiAl opened a research laboratory in Pudong, Shanghai. The facility includes laboratories and quality control (QC) facilities for nanotube applications in batteries, composites, polymers, elastomers, and coatings. Later that year, the United States Environmental Protection Agency (EPA) published a Significant New Use Rule (SNUR) in the Federal Register for OCSiAl’s products which permitted their commercialization.

In October 2020, OCSiAl opened a research laboratory in Foetz, Luxembourg. The facility develops and tests material formulations and processing methods to improve production systems.

In 2021, Daikin Industries invested in OCSiAl, valuing it at approximately $1.7 billion, to further develop lithium-ion battery materials.

In 2024, OCSiAl appointed former Marvel Entertainment chief executive Peter Cuneo as its board chairman. In October 2024, OCSiAl opened a production facility in Serbia with an annual capacity of 60 tonnes of graphene nanotubes. It also announced plans to construct an additional facility in Serbia and a production hub in Differdange, Luxembourg.

== Products ==
OCSiAI's main product is high-purity graphene nanotubes along with graphene-nanotube-based concentrates and suspensions for battery applications and for thermoplastics, thermosets, and elastomers.

OCSiAI’s graphene nanotubes are commercially applied in industrial rubber parts, functional prosthetics, battery cells, paints and coatings, composites, smart textiles, personal protective equipment, consumer electronics, packaging, industrial tanks, tires, and various plastics.
