= Carbon nanotube springs =

Carbon nanotube springs are springs made of carbon nanotubes (CNTs). They are an alternate form of high-density, lightweight, reversible energy storage based on the elastic deformations of CNTs. Many previous studies on the mechanical properties of CNTs have revealed that they possess high stiffness, strength and flexibility. The Young's modulus of CNTs is 1 TPa and they have the ability to sustain reversible tensile strains of 6% and the mechanical springs based on these structures are likely to surpass the current energy storage capabilities of existing steel springs and provide a viable alternative to electrochemical batteries. The obtainable energy density is predicted to be highest under tensile loading, with an energy density in the springs themselves about 2500 times greater than the energy density that can be reached in steel springs, and 10 times greater than the energy density of lithium-ion batteries.

The process of elastic energy storage in a CNT involves deforming it under an applied load. On removal of the applied load the energy released from the CNT can be used to perform mechanical work. A CNT has the ability to deform reversibly and a spring made from it can undergo repeated charge-discharge cycles without fatigue.

A CNT spring can store elastic strain energy with a density several orders of magnitude higher than conventional springs made of steel. Strain energy density in a material is proportional to the product of its Young's modulus and the square of the applied strain.

When multi-walled nanotubes (MWCNTs) are loaded, the majority of the applied load is borne by the outer shell. Owing to this limited load transfer between the different layers of MWCNTs, single walled nanotubes (SWCNTs) are more useful structural materials for springs.

== Energy storage in CNT springs ==
Springs for energy storage can be made of SWCNTs or MWCNTs arranged in dense bundles of long, aligned tubes called "forests" of CNTs that are grown by chemical vapor deposition (CVD). The "forests" can grow to heights of up to 6 millimeters. A deformed CNT requires a support structure to carry the load of the spring prior to discharge. A mechanical spring must be coupled to external mechanisms to build a power source that is functionally useful. On its own a spring stores potential energy when an external force is applied to it, but releases the energy in a single rapid burst once the force is removed. An effective power source needs to store energy over a period of time, release the energy only when needed and discharge the energy at a desired power level. A CNT based portable power source should have a basic architecture made of four main components, namely a CNT spring, a supporting structure for the spring, a generator-motor combination, and a coupling mechanism between the spring and the generator.

For CNTs arranged in groups/bundles called "forests" as described earlier, efficient packing and good alignment in necessary between the tubes to achieve a high energy density. Good load transfer and effective attachment techniques are required so that the shells can be loaded to near their elastic limit.

Choosing the appropriate deformation mode consisting of any amongst axial tension, axial compression, torsion or bending or a combination of any of them. A criterion for choosing a deformation mode is not only the highest energy density, but also the proper integration of the deformed spring with the rest of the power dissipation mechanism.

A support structure is required to hold the CNT spring in the fully loaded configuration prior to its release. The design of the support structure will depend on the scale of the spring, the deformation mode the CNT is being subjected to and the architecture of the rest of the system. The material selected for the structure should have high strength, because the added mass and volume of the support contribute to reducing the energy density of the entire system.

== Energy storage calculations ==
=== Axial tension ===
Analysis is performed on CNTs subject to tensile loads. A hollow cylindrical structure of CNT of length L, diameter d and mean radius r is considered. The tube has thickness n.h, where n is the number of layers in the CNT and h=0.34 nm is the thickness of one shell. The Young's modulus of the material of the CNT is E. In case of SWCNTs, n=1 and n>1 in case of MWCNTs. The cylinder has inner and outer radii of

$r_i = r - \frac{nh}{2}$

and

$r_o = r + \frac{nh}{2}$.

The shell's cross-sectional area is

$A = \pi(r_o^2 - r_i^2)$

and the total enclosed area is

$A_t = \pi r_o^2$.

The strain energy that can be stored in the bar under axial compression to a strain of $\epsilon\,$ is

$U =\frac{1}{2} \iiint (\sigma_x\,\epsilon_x\,$)$\, dx\, dy\, dz =\frac{1}{2}E\epsilon^2\ AL$ = $\frac{1}{2}E\epsilon^2\pi (r_o^2 - r_i^2) L$

The strain energy density is simply the ratio of the strain energy and the enclosed volume. Therefore, in order for the strain energy density to be high the value of $A/A_t$ should be large. So, a spring in axial tension should consist of either SWCNTs with small diameters or uniformly loaded MWCNTs with densely packed shells to maximize $A/A_t$.

The CNTs are arranged in groupings, generally bundles. The strain energy density must be reduced by a fill factor k to account for the spacing between the individual CNTs.

Consider the cross-section of a bundle of closely packed SWCNTs of radius r, arranged into a two-dimensional triangular lattice with a lattice constant of 2r+h. Ideal packing is assumed with a spacing of h=0.34 nm which is taken equal to the graphitic spacing. When the CNTs are arranged in a bundle the best packing fraction is produced when they are packed in a hexagonal closed packed structure.

Consider a cross section of one bundle. A hexagonal shape will be observed. The hexagonal shape with an area of $A_h$ is taken to be the repeating geometrical unit in the bundle. Calculations can be performed to show that fill factor k = 91%. In reality, there may not be ideal packing within a bundle, as the actual fraction k may be lower than the value calculated.

The expression of strain energy shows that it is advantageous to apply a high tensile strain to the springs to maximize energy storage since strain energy is proportional to square of the strain.

=== Axial compression ===
Analysis is performed on CNTs subject to compressive loads. The CNT is assumed to be a hollow cylindrical beam of length L, Young's modulus E, and thickness n.h, where n is the number of layers and h=0.34 nm is the thickness of one shell (taken equal to the separation between graphene sheets in graphite). The continuous tube has a mean radius r and diameter d. The cylinder has inner and outer radii of

$r_i = r - \frac{nh}{2}$

and

$r_o = r + \frac{nh}{2}$.

The shell's cross-sectional area is

$A = \pi(r_o^2 - r_i^2)$

and the total enclosed area is

$A_t = \pi r_o^2$.

The strain energy that can be stored in the bar under axial compression to a strain of $\epsilon\,$ is

$U =\frac{1}{2} \iiint (\sigma_x\,\epsilon_x\,$)$\, dx\, dy\, dz =\frac{1}{2}E\epsilon^2\ AL$ = $\frac{1}{2}E\epsilon^2\pi (r_o^2 - r_i^2) L$

The strain energy density is just the strain energy divided by the enclosed volume. High energy densities are achieved with a high $A/A_t$ ratio. Therefore, in order for CNT springs to achieve a high energy density either SWCNTs with small diameters or MWCNTs with densely packed shells should be used.

== Support structure ==
The purpose of using a support structure is to be able to store energy before it is released for use. The support structure should be strong enough to support the applied load (used to compress the CNTs) without reaching failure itself. Another point of consideration is that the energy density of the combined spring and supporting structure is always lower than the energy density of the spring alone.

== Energy density comparison ==
A CNT spring made of bundles of densely packed 1 nm diameter SWCNTs stretched to a 10% strain is predicted to have an energy density of 3.4×10^{6} kJ/m^{3}. The energy density of CNT springs loaded in tension is higher than the energy density of CNT springs loaded in compression. Whereas the current maximum energy density of a carbon-steel watch spring is reported to be between 1080 kJ/m^{3} and 3000 kJ/m^{3}. Calculations show that when a support structure made of single crystal silicon carbide is used the energy density of CNT springs reduces to 1×10^{6} kJ/m^{3}. Even after considering a support structure and other energy extraction hardware associated with a CNT spring energy harvesting device, its energy density is much greater than mechanical springs and is in approximately the same range as that of lithium-ion batteries. The energy density is much lower than the energy density of any hydrocarbon used in combustion processes.

== Failure processes that limit energy storage ==
A large number of CNTs are needed to store a significant amount of energy that can be used for macroscopic processes. In order to achieve such a large amount of energy storage the CNT springs must maintain high stiffness and elasticity. It is in practice quite difficult to have such high stiffness and elastic strains in yarns or fibers made up of assemblies of CNTs as they seldom maintain mechanical properties of an individual SWCNT. This behavior occurs due to atomic defects and imperfect organisation.

Elastic loading is the preferred loading mechanism for reversible energy storage, experiments have been performed that indicate that loading within the fibers deviates from purely elastic behavior.

Only a portion of the CNTs contribute to the load bearing at a given strain. The unequal amount of slack within each CNT due to the presence of atomic defects and tangling causes different CNTs to fracture at different strains.

When MWCNTs are loaded in tension it is difficult to grasp their inner shells. Tensile tests of MWCNTs attached to atomic force microscope (AFM) tips at both ends show that fracture occurs at the outer shell in a way such that majority loading occurs at the outer shell and little load transfer occurs to the inner shells. This causes the stiffness and strength of MWCNTs to be lower than they would be if the shells were loaded equally.
