= Eikos =

American technology company

Eikos, Inc was a technology company based in Franklin, Massachusetts that developed transparent, electrically conductive carbon nanotube films and nanotube inks for transparent conductive coatings. Eikos branded its technology as Invisicon. It was founded in 1996 by Joseph Piche.

Eikos aimed to replace indium tin oxide (ITO) and conducting polymers with carbon nanotube transparent conductors in several common electronic devices, such as touch screens, LCDs, OLEDs, photovoltaics, electroluminescent lamps, electronic paper. Nanotube films have several advantages over ITO, which make them attractive in these markets. For example, nanotube films are exceptionally flexible and can be deposited using low cost, atmospheric coating methods.

Eikos' coatings were recognized by R&D Magazine with a R&D 100 Award in 2005 for environmentally friendly coatings and the Micro/Nano 25 in 2006. Eikos also was awarded a Technology Innovation Award for Materials and other Base Technologies by The Wall Street Journal in September, 2006.
