= Nanotube membrane =

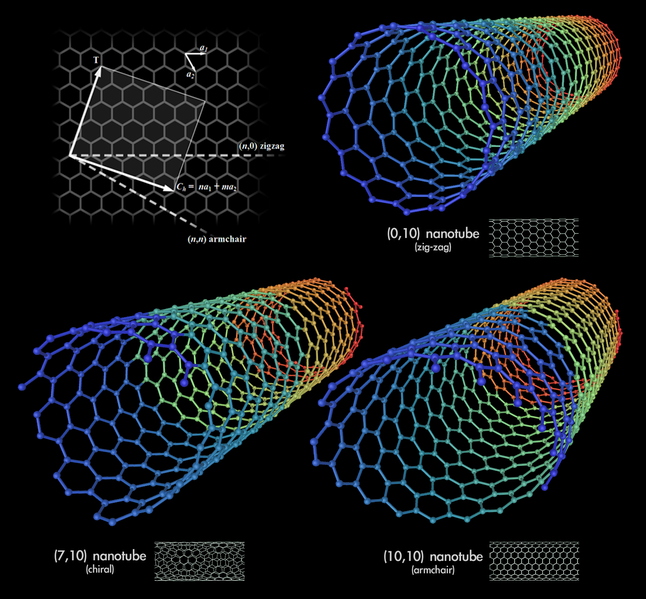
Nanotube membrane

Nanotube membranes are either a single, open-ended nanotube (CNT) or a film composed of an array of nanotubes that are oriented perpendicularly to the surface of an impermeable film matrix like the cells of a honeycomb. 'Impermeable' is essential here to distinguish nanotube membrane with traditional, well known porous membranes. Fluids and gas molecules may pass through the membrane en masse but only through the nanotubes. For instance, water molecules form ordered hydrogen bonds that act like chains as they pass through the CNTs. This results in an almost frictionless or atomically smooth interface between the nanotubes and water which relate to a "slip length" of the hydrophobic interface. Properties like the slip length that describe the non-continuum behavior of the water within the pore walls are disregarded in simple hydrodynamic systems and absent from the Hagen–Poiseuille equation. Molecular dynamic simulations better characterize the flow of water molecules through the carbon nanotubes with a varied form of the Hagen–Poiseuille equation that takes into account slip length.

Transport of polystyrene particles (60 and 100 nm diameter) through single-tube membranes (150 nm) was reported in 2000. Soon after, ensemble membranes consisting of multi-walled and double-walled carbon nanotubes were fabricated and studied. It was shown that water can pass through the graphitic nanotube cores of the membrane at up to five magnitudes greater than classical fluid dynamics would predict, via the Hagen-Poiseuille equation, both for multiwall tubes (inner diameter 7 nm) and double-wall tubes (inner diameter <2 nm).

In experiments by Holt et al., pure water (~1.0020 cP viscosity) was transported through three samples of double-walled carbon nanotubes in a silicon nitride matrix with varying membrane fluxes and thicknesses. These membranes were found to have enhanced flow that was more than three orders of magnitude faster than the expected for no-slip hydrodynamic flow as calculated by the Hagen–Poiseuille equation. These results for nanotubes with the 1–2 nm diameter pores corresponded to about 10–40 water molecules per nm^{2} per nanosecond. In a similar experiment by Mainak Majumder et al., nanotubes of about 7 nm in diameter in solid polystyrene were tested for their fluid velocities. These results similarly showed that the nanotubes have long slip-planes and flow rates were found to be four to five orders of magnitude faster than conventional fluid flow predictions.

It was further demonstrated that the flow of water through carbon nanotube membranes (without filler matrix, thus flow on the outside surface of CNTs) can be controlled through the application of electric current. Among many potential uses that nanotube membranes might one day be employed is the desalination of water.

Mitra et al. (^{8-14}) pioneered a novel architecture in producing CNT based membrane. This method creates a superior membrane by immobilizing carbon nanotubes in the pores and on the membrane surface. In their work, the CNTs are immobilized into polymeric or ceramic membranes leading to the development of unique membrane structure referred to as the carbon nanotube immobilized membrane (CNIM). This was achieved by immobilizing CNT from a dispersed form. Such membranes are robust, thermally stable, and possess high selectivity. The goal here is to immobilize CNTs such that their surfaces are free to interact directly with the solute. The membrane produced by this method has shown dramatic enhancements in flux and selectivity in various applications, such as sea water desalination (^{8,9}), membrane extraction (^{10}), water purification by the removal of volatile organics from water (^{11}) and for micro scale membrane extraction for the analysis of water pollutants (^{12-14}).

In 2016, large format commercial scale CNT membranes were introduced for the first time. Initially these membranes were produced in a flat sheet format similar to those previously made in research laboratories, although at a much larger scale. In 2017, the company announced the development of a hollow fiber membrane CNT membrane, with nanotubes oriented radially perpendicular to the membrane's surface, something that had never been achieved before.

In all cases, the CNTs serve as unique pores that enhance mass transport across the membrane, selecting based on size or chemical affinity. For example, in the case of desalination the CNTs enhance the transport for water while blocking or reducing the transmission of salts, based on the size of hydrated salt ions. In the case of the removal of organics such as in water purification, pervaporation and extraction, CNT membranes preferentially permeate the organics, allowing for separations that had previously only been possible using methods like distillation. One example of organic / water separations is the separation of ethanol from water, an application in which CNT membranes show nearly ideal selectivity for the transport of ethanol.

== Nanopore measurement in track etched membrane ==
Since the discovery of track-etched technology in the late 1960s, filter membranes with needed diameter have found potential use in various fields including food safety, environmental pollution, biology, medicine, fuel cell, and chemistry. These track-etched membranes are typically made in polymer membrane through track-etching procedure, during which the polymer membrane is first irradiated by heavy ion beam to form tracks and then cylindrical pores or asymmetric pores are created along the track after wet etching.

As important as fabrication of the filter membranes is the characterization and measurement of the pores in the membrane. Until now, a few of methods have been developed, which can be classified into the following categories according to the physical mechanisms they exploited: Imaging methods such as scanning electron microscopy (SEM), transmission electron microscopy (TEM), atomic force microscopy (AFM); fluid transports such as bubble point and gas transport; fluid adsorptions such as nitrogen adsorption/desorption (BEH), mercury porosimetry, liquid–vapor equilibrium (BJH), gas–liquid equilibrium (permoporometry) and liquid–solid equilibrium (thermoporometry); electronic conductance; ultrasonic spectroscopy;19 Molecular Transport.

More recently, the use of light transmission technique as a method for nanopore size measurement has been proposed.

== See also ==
- Carbon nanotube
- Nanofiltration
- Nanofluidics
- Potential applications of carbon nanotubes
