= LeDock =

- Original author: Lephar
- Developer: Hongtao Zhao
- Release: 12 June 2014; 12 years ago (Windows version)
- Written in: C++
- Operating system: Linux, macOS, and Windows
- Type: Molecular docking
- Website: www.lephar.com/software.html

LeDock is a molecular docking software, designed for protein-ligand interactions, that is compatible with Linux, macOS, and Windows.

The software can run as a standalone programme or from Jupyter Notebook. It supports the Tripos Mol2 file format.

== Methodology ==
LeDock utilizes a simulated annealing and genetic algorithm approach for facilitating the docking process of ligands with protein targets. The software employs a knowledge-based scoring scheme that is derived from extensive prospective virtual screening campaigns. It is categorized as a flexible docking method.

== Performance ==
In a study involving 2,002 protein-ligand complexes, LeDock was repoted to have high sampling power. The Linux version contains command line tools to run automated virtual screening of different large molecular libraries in the cloud.

In a performance evaluation of ten docking programs, LeDock demonstrated strong sampling power when compared against other commercial and academic alternatives. According to a review from 2017, LeDock was noted for its effectiveness in sampling ligand conformational space, identifying near-native binding poses, and having a flexible docking protocol. The Linux version includes tools for high-throughput virtual screening in the cloud.

== See also ==
- Drug design
- Macromolecular docking
- Molecular mechanics
- Molecular modelling
- Protein structure
- Protein design
- List of software for molecular mechanics modeling
- List of protein-ligand docking software
- Molecular design software
- Lead Finder
- Virtual screening
- Scoring functions for docking
