= RDock =

Free molecular docking software

rDock
- Logo of rDock
- Original author: Vernalis R&D
- Developers: University of York, University of Barcelona
- Release: 1998; 28 years ago
- Stable release: 2013.1 / June 13, 2014; 12 years ago
- Written in: C++
- Operating system: Linux
- Type: Protein–ligand docking
- License: GNU LGPL
- Website: rdock.sourceforge.net
- Repository: github.com/CBDD/rDock

rDock (previously RiboDock) is an open-source molecular docking software that can be used for docking small molecules against proteins and nucleic acids. It is primarily designed for high-throughput virtual screening and prediction of binding mode.

== History ==
The development of rDock started in 1998 in RiboTargets (later Vernalis (R&D) Ltd). The software was originally called RiboDock. The development went on until 2006 when the software was licensed to University of York for academic distribution and also maintenance.

Six years later, in 2012, Vernalis and University of York decided to release rDock as open-source software to allow its further development by the wider community. The version that was released as open source is developed and supported by University of Barcelona on SourceForge. The development on SourceForge stalled after June 2014 and the repository is considered deprecated after the migration to GitHub.

A fork named RxDock continued the development of rDock from April 2019 until March 2022 on GitLab. As of April 2022, the RxDock project development activity is very low.

== See also ==
- Docking (molecular)
- Virtual screening
- List of protein-ligand docking software
