= FlexAID =

Free molecular docking software

Flexible Artificial Intelligence Docking (FlexAID)
- Original authors: Louis-Philippe Morency, Francis Gaudreault, Rafael J. Najmanovich
- Written in: C, C++
- Operating system: Linux, macOS, Win64 (support and development dropped from 2022 onward)
- Platform: x86_64, ARM-based System on Chip (Apple M1 [Pro Max])
- Type: Protein–ligand docking
- License: Apache License
- Website: nrglab.github.io
- Repository: github.com/NRGlab/FlexAID

FlexAID is a molecular docking software that can use small molecules and peptides as ligands and proteins and nucleic acids as docking targets. As the name suggests, FlexAID supports full ligand flexibility as well side-chain flexibility of the target. It does using a soft scoring function based on the complementarity of the two surfaces (ligand and target).

FlexAID has been shown to outperform existing widely used software such as AutoDock Vina and FlexX in the prediction of binding poses. This is particularly true in cases where target flexibility is crucial, such as is likely to be the case when using homology models. The source code is available on GitHub under Apache License.

== Graphical user interface ==
A PyMOL plugin for FlexAID, NRGsuite, has also been developed by the original authors.

== See also ==
- Docking (molecular)
- Virtual screening
- List of protein-ligand docking software
