= List of protein-ligand docking software =

The number of notable protein-ligand docking programs currently available is high and has been steadily increasing over the last decades. The following list presents an overview of the most common notable programs, listed alphabetically, with indication of the corresponding year of publication, involved organisation or institution, short description, availability of a webservice and the license. This table is comprehensive but not complete.

Program	Year Published	Organisation	Description	Webservice	License
AutoDock	1990	The Scripps Research Institute	Automated docking of ligand to macromolecule by Lamarckian Genetic Algorithm and Empirical Free Energy Scoring Function	No	Open source (GNU GPL)
DOCK	1988	University of California-San Francisco	Based on Geometric Matching Algorithm	No	Freeware for academic use
FlexAID	2015	University of Sherbrooke	Target side-chain flexibility and soft scoring function, based on surface complementarity	No	Open source (Apache License)
LeDock	2016	Lephar	Program for fast and accurate flexible docking of small molecules into a protein	No	Freeware for academic use
Glide	2004	Schrödinger, Inc.	Glide is a ligand docking program for predicting protein-ligand binding modes and ranking ligands via high-throughput virtual screening. Glide utilizes two different scoring functions, SP and XP GlideScore, to rank-order compounds. Three modes of sampling ligand conformational and positional degrees of freedom are available to determine the optimal ligand orientation relative to a rigid protein receptor geometry	No	commercial
Molecular Operating Environment (MOE)	2008	Chemical Computing Group	Docking application within MOE; choice of placement methods (including alpha sphere methods) and scoring functions (including London dG)	No	Commercial
rDock	1998 (commercial); 2006 (academic); 2012 (open source)	Vernalis R&D (commercial); University of York (academic); University of Barcelona (open source)	HTVS of small molecules against proteins and nucleic acids, binding mode prediction	No	Open source (GNU LGPL) (formerly commercial, academic)
SEED	1999	University of Zurich	Automated docking of fragments with evaluation of free energy of binding including electrostatic solvation effects in the continuum dielectric approximation (generalized Born)	No	Open source (GNU GPL)
