= Vernalis =

Vernalis may refer to:

- Vernalis Research, a British pharmaceutical research company
- Vernalis plc, a former British pharmaceutical company (2003-2018)
- Vernalis Group, a former British pharmaceutical company (1991-2003)
- Vernalis, California, an unincorporated US community

== See also ==
- Includes many plant and animal names
