= S. vernalis =

S. vernalis may refer to:

- Senecio vernalis, the Eastern groundsel, a plant species
- Stokesia vernalis, a single-celled ciliate protozoa species

== See also ==
- Vernalis (disambiguation)
