= Diane Joseph-McCarthy =

American Scientist and Biomedical Engineer

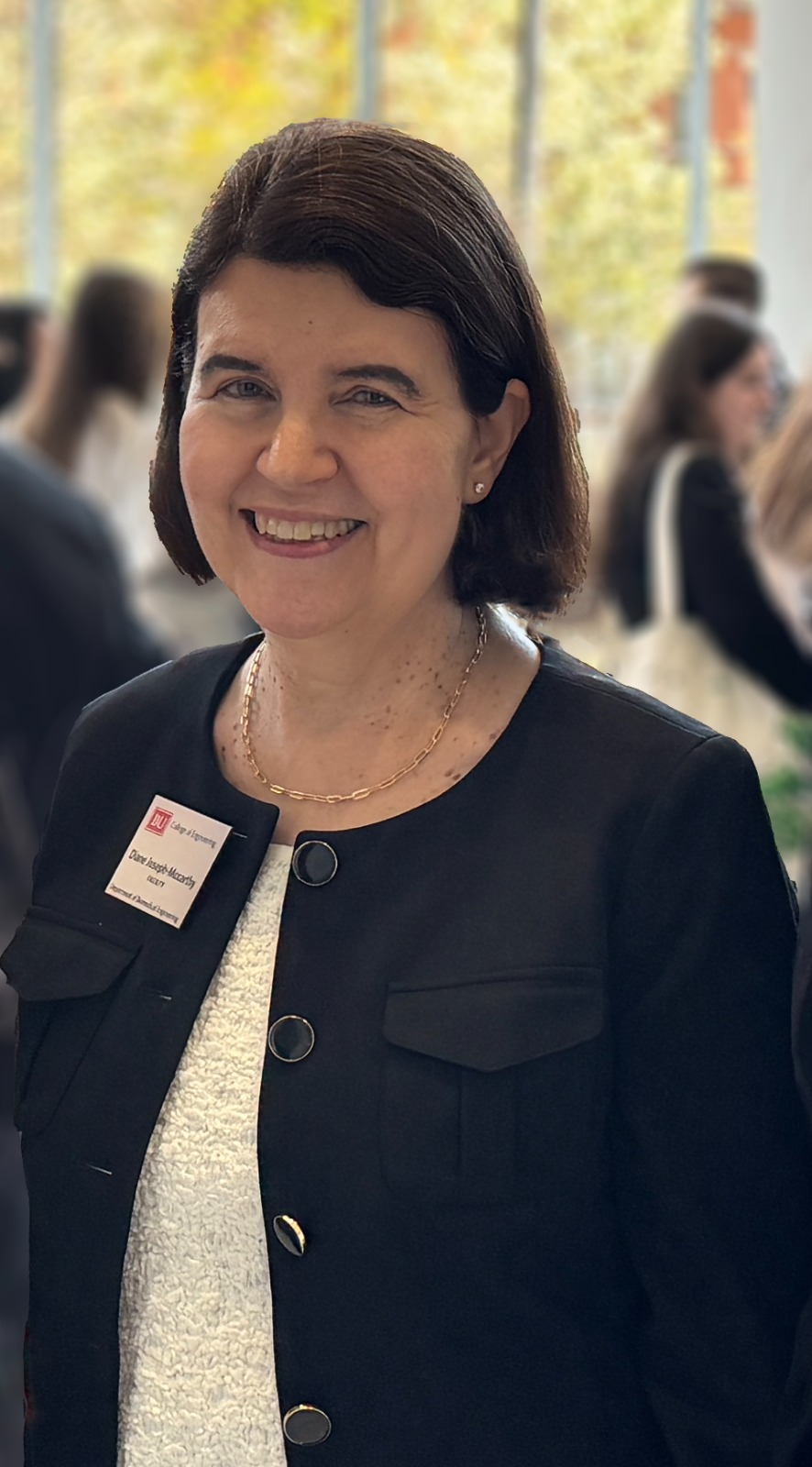
- Education: Boston University (BA), Massachusetts Institute of Technology (PhD)
- Known for: Computational approaches to drug discovery, molecular modeling, fragment-based lead discovery
- Awards: Fellow of the American Institute for Medical and Biological Engineering (2023)
- Scientific career
- Fields: Biomedical engineering, Computational chemistry, Drug discovery
- Workplaces: Boston University; EnBiotix; AstraZeneca

Diane Joseph-McCarthy is an American biomedical engineer whose work focuses on computational approaches to drug discovery. She serves as Executive Director of the Bioengineering Technology & Entrepreneurship Center (BTEC) and Professor of Practice in Biomedical Engineering at Boston University

== Early life and education ==
After graduating from Boston University with a Bachelor of Arts degree, Joseph-McCarthy went on to the Massachusetts Institute of Technology to obtain a PhD under Professor Gregory A. Petsko and Martin Karplus. After that, she worked as a postdoctoral researcher at Harvard Medical School and Harvard University.

== Career ==
Joseph-McCarthy has worked in both academic and industrial settings in the fields of computational chemistry and drug discovery. Earlier in her career, she was employed in the pharmaceutical and biotechnology sectors. While working for AstraZeneca in the Infection Innovative Medicines & Early Development unit, she participated in research projects related to the creation of antimicrobial medications.

Later, she became Vice President of Translational Science and then Senior Vice President of Discovery and Early Development at EnBiotix.

Later on, Joseph-McCarthy joined Boston University, where she is currently the Executive Director of the Bioengineering Technology & Entrepreneurship Center (BTEC). The program supports bioengineering and translational science research and entrepreneurship projects.

== Research ==
Joseph-McCarthy's research has focused on computer methods used in drug discovery and molecular modelling. Her work has looked at protein-ligand interactions, structure-based ligand design, and fragment-based lead discovery. She has also contributed to studies on predicting protein binding sites and identifying antibody-binding epitopes using computational techniques.

== Awards and recognition ==
In 2023, Joseph-McCarthy was elected a Fellow of the American Institute for Medical and Biological Engineering (AIMBE), which recognizes contributions to medical and biological engineering.

== Selected publications ==
- Joseph-McCarthy, Diane (1999). "Computational approaches to structure-based ligand design". Pharmacology & Therapeutics. 84 (2): 179–191. doi:10.1016/s0163-7258(99)00031-5. PMID 10596905.
- Joseph, D.; Petsko, G. A.; Karplus, M. (1990-09-21). "Anatomy of a conformational change: hinged "lid" motion of the triosephosphate isomerase loop". Science. 249 (4975): 1425–1428. Bibcode:1990Sci...249.1425J. doi:10.1126/science.2402636. PMID 2402636.
- MacKerell, A. D.; Bashford, D.; Bellott, M.; Dunbrack, R. L.; Evanseck, J. D.; Field, M. J.; Fischer, S.; Gao, J.; Guo, H.; Ha, S.; Joseph-McCarthy, D.; Kuchnir, L.; Kuczera, K.; Lau, F. T.; Mattos, C. (1998-04-30). "All-atom empirical potential for molecular modeling and dynamics studies of proteins". The Journal of Physical Chemistry B. 102 (18): 3586–3616. Bibcode:1998JPCB..102.3586M. doi:10.1021/jp973084f. PMID 24889800.
- Joseph-McCarthy, Diane; Campbell, Arthur J.; Kern, Gunther; Moustakas, Demetri (2014-03-24). "Fragment-based lead discovery and design". Journal of Chemical Information and Modeling. 54 (3): 693–704. doi:10.1021/ci400731w. PMID 24490951.
