= Valerie Daggett =

American biochemist

Valerie D. Daggett
- Education: Reed College, University of California, San Francisco
- Known for: Large-scale simulations of protein folding
- Scientific career
- Institutions: Stanford University
- Thesis: Molecular modelling of peptides and proteins (1990)
- Doctoral advisor: Irwin Kuntz, Peter Kollman
- Other academic advisors: Michael Levitt
- Website: https://sites.uw.edu/daggett-lab

Valerie Daggett is a professor of bioengineering at the University of Washington in Seattle, Washington, United States.

== Education and career ==
Daggett has a B.S. from Reed College in 1983. She received her Ph.D. from the University of California, San Francisco, advised by Irwin Kuntz and Peter Kollman, and subsequently held a postdoctoral position at Stanford University with Michael Levitt, a co-recipient of the 2013 Nobel Prize in Chemistry.

As of 2021, she is also the chief executive officer of AltPep, a biomedical startup that was a spinoff from her research at the University of Washington.

== Research ==
Her laboratory focuses on work in molecular dynamics simulations of proteins and other biomolecules. Daggett is well known for large-scale simulations of protein folding, especially unfolding, and native state dynamics through her "dynameomics" project. In 2005, the Daggett laboratory was awarded a supercomputing grant by the U.S. Department of Energy, which was renewed for almost two million processor-hours in 2006; the group has also participated in Microsoft Research high-performance computing projects.

== Awards and honors ==
In 2011, Daggett was named a fellow of the Biophysical Society. Daggett was one of two University of Washington scientists named 2015 American Institute for Medical and Biological Engineering fellows.
