= De novo drug design =

De novo drug design is a specialized approach within drug discovery, focusing on the creation of molecular structures with drug-like properties that are distinct from existing therapeutic agents. Unlike traditional drug development, which iteratively modifies known molecules, de novo methods generate novel structures from scratch, leveraging either rational or random approaches. This technique often utilizes detailed information about the target structure (typically a protein) and known binders to generate new patterns of binding.

== See also ==
- Drug design
- Virtual screening
- Molecular design software
