= Retro screening =

Approach to determine the specificity and selectivity of a therapeutic drug

Retro screening, also known as reverse screening (RS), is a computational approach for identifying potential protein targets, unintended targets, and off-target interactions of a bioactive or therapeutic molecule.. It proceeds in the opposite direction to the so-called virtual screening (VS). In VS, the goal is to use a protein target to identify a high-affinity ligand from a search library typically containing hundreds of thousands of small molecules. In contrast, RS starts with a known drug or bioactive molecule and screens it against a panel or database of potential protein targets, using experimentally determined and/or computationally predicted protein structures(obtained from both experimental and modeling techniques). Accordingly, predicted or experimentally confirmed interactions of the drug with proteins beyond its intended target can provide information about its selectivity, potential off-target effects, and possible adverse effects. RS can provide an additional computational layer for target identification, off-target prediction, drug repurposing, and assessment of potential adverse effects in drug discovery.
