= Katchalski-Katzir algorithm =

Algorithm for docking of rigid molecules

The Katchalski-Katzir algorithm is an algorithm for docking of rigid molecules, developed by Ephraim Katchalski-Katzir, Isaac Shariv and Miriam Eisenstein.

In 1990 Professor Ephraim Katchalski-Katzir, former president of the state of Israel, gathered a group of physicists, chemists and biologists at the Weizmann Institute of Science, to discuss intermolecular recognition. One of the outcomes of these discussions was the Katchalski-Katzir Algorithm, proposed by Dr. Isaac Shariv, a physics PhD student at the time. The Algorithm was implemented in a computer program, MolFit, by Dr. Miriam Eisenstein from the department of Structural Chemistry.

It is a purely geometric algorithm, but some extensions of it also implement electrostatics.

The algorithm's first step is mapping the molecules onto grids, with each point of a grid being marked as either:

- outside the molecule
- on the molecule's surface
- inside the molecule

The algorithm increases the surface contact and minimizes volume overlap. It is straightforward to compute such a score for a single alignment, but there are too many possible ways to align the molecules to simply iterate over them all.

To compute the scores for many alignments efficiently, fast Fourier transform (FFT) is applied to both grids. Having the grids in FFT form lets the scoring to be computed for many different alignments very quickly.

The Katchalski-Katzir algorithm is a fast but rather limited algorithm. It is usually used to quickly filter out the obviously wrong candidate structures. A structure may have good Katchalski-Katzir score (that is, fits well geometrically), but be a very bad fit overall, for example due to unfavourable electrostatic interactions or hydrophobic and hydrophilic groups facing each other. This is not a serious problem, as such structures can be filtered out later. A bigger issue is when a favourable structure is rejected by the algorithm. Some cases where this may happen include bad geometric fit being overcome by very strong attractive forces, or where the shape of the target changes because of the interactions (induced fit).

Programs that implement the Katchalski-Katzir algorithm include MolFit and FTDock.

== See also ==
- Convolution theorem
- Molecular modelling
