= Irwin "Tack" Kuntz =

Tack Kuntz
- Born: Irwin Douglas Kuntz
- Citizenship: United States
- Education: Princeton University (BA); University of California, Berkeley (PhD)
- Known for: DOCK
- Scientific career
- Fields: Chemistry; Biology
- Workplaces: University of California, San Francisco
- Thesis: Spectroscopic studies of photosynthesis (1965)
- Doctoral students: Patricia Babbitt
- Website: mdi.ucsf.edu/KuntzBio.html

Irwin Douglas "Tack" Kuntz is an important figure in the field of computer-aided drug design and molecular modeling. He is a pioneer in the development and conception of the area of study known as molecular docking. One of the first docking programs DOCK was developed in his group in 1982.

== Education ==
Tack received his Bachelor of Arts degree in physical chemistry from Princeton University in 1961 and his PhD from the University of California, Berkeley in 1965 for spectroscopic studies of photosynthesis.

== Career and research ==
He moved to the Department of Pharmaceutical Chemistry the University of California, San Francisco in the early 1970s. He founded the Molecular Design Institute at UCSF in 1993. He was awarded the UCSF medal in 2018.
