= British Biotech =

British based Biotechnology company

British Biotech plc (LSE:BBG Nasdaq:BBIOY)
- Industry: Biotechnology
- Founded: 1986
- Defunct: 2003
- Fate: Merged
- Successor: Vernalis plc
- Headquarters: Oxford, United Kingdom
- Key people: CEO; Keith McCullagh, 1986–1998; Elliot Goldstein, 1998–2002; Tim Edwards, 2002–2003; Chair; Brian Richards, 1986–1998; Christopher Hampson, 1998–2002; Peter Fellner, 2002–2003
- Number of employees: 500

British Biotech was a British-based biotechnology company founded as British Biotechnology Limited in 1986 by former G D Searle managers Keith McCullagh and Brian Richards. It was the first British biotech company to be publicly listed when it was floated on 1 July 1992.

== Controversy ==
In 1996, despite having no compounds on or near the market, the company was temporarily valued at nearly $2.5 billion, largely on the basis of its two main development drugs: marimastat (a novel matrix metalloprotease inhibitor for cancer treatment) and lexipafant (Zacutex, for pancreatitis). Batimastat (codename BB94) progressed as far as stage 3 in its clinical trial, although not orally bioavailable, there are other methods of administration, including transdermal.

In February 1998, Dr Andrew Millar was dismissed as Head of Clinical Research and went on to make allegations that "the Board were running a business plan consistent only with extreme and unfounded optimism". These events were the subject of an inquiry by the House of Commons Select Committee on Science and Technology in August 1998 which absolved Dr Millar of any responsibility for the company's problems.

Subsequent investigations by the Securities and Exchange Commission, Food and Drug Administration, London Stock Exchange and the European Medicines Evaluation Agency found that British Biotech had wilfully misled the public about the progress of marimastat and that unblinding data before the end of clinical trials does not necessarily invalidate the results. Marimastat underwent Phase III trials in collaboration with Schering-Plough Corporation. Further development of Zacutex was abandoned due to poor clinical trial results.

The corporate politics behind the downfall of British Biotech was later recorded for a BBC2 Series Blood on the Carpet.

== Disappearance ==
In 2003, British Biotech merged with RiboTargets and then into Vernalis Group. The British Biotech company name disappeared after this merger and remaining staff integrated into the new Vernalis plc organisation in Winnersh, Berkshire.
