= Patricia Babbitt =

American pharmaceutical chemist

- Born: Patricia Clement Babbitt
- Education: University of California, San Francisco (PhD)
- Awards: ISCB Fellow (2018)
- Scientific career
- Fields: Bioinformatics; Computational biology
- Institutions: University of California, San Francisco
- Thesis: Sequence determination, expression, and site-directed mutagenesis of creatine kinase (1988)
- Doctoral advisor: George L. Kenyon; Irwin Kuntz
- Website: profiles.ucsf.edu/patricia.babbitt

Patricia Clement Babbitt is a Professor and Principal Investigator (PI) in the school of pharmacy at the University of California, San Francisco (UCSF).

== Education ==
Patricia Babbitt earned a PhD in pharmaceutical chemistry in 1988 from the University of California, San Francisco for research supervised by George L. Kenyon and Irwin Kuntz.

== Career and research ==
Babbitt serves as the director of the UCSF bioinformatics and medical informatics graduate program. She also serves on the advisory boards for the UniProt, InterPro and MetaCyc databases, the Howard Hughes Medical Institute (HHMI) scientific review board, and as a deputy editor for PLOS Computational Biology. Her research interests include bioinformatics and computational biology.

=== Awards and honors ===
Babbitt was elected a Fellow of the International Society for Computational Biology (ISCB) in 2018 for “outstanding contributions to the fields of computational biology and bioinformatics”.
