= DOCK =

Molecular modelling software

- Original authors: Brian K. Shoichet, David A. Case, Robert C. Rizzo
- Developer: University of California, San Francisco
- Initial release: 1982; 43 years ago
- Stable release: 3 series: 3.7; 6 series: 6.7 / 12 February 2015; 10 years ago
- Written in: DOCK 3: Fortran, C DOCK 6: C++, C, Fortran 77
- Operating system: DOCK 3: source code DOCK 6: Linux, macOS, Windows
- Platform: x86, x86-64
- Size: 100 MB
- Available in: English
- Type: Molecular docking
- License: Proprietary: freeware academic, commercial
- Website: dock.compbio.ucsf.edu

The program UCSF DOCK was created in the 1980s by Irwin "Tack" Kuntz's Group, and was the first docking program. DOCK uses geometric algorithms to predict the binding modes of small molecules. Brian K. Shoichet, David A. Case, and Robert C. Rizzo are codevelopers of DOCK.

Two versions of the docking program are actively developed: DOCK 6 and DOCK 3.

Ligand sampling methods used by the program DOCK include.

- Rigid docking: shape matching, uses spheres placed in the pocket and performs bipartite matching between those spheres and the molecule (all versions).
- Flexible ligand is accounted for using the following methods: an algorithm called anchor and grow (v4-v6), and hierarchical docking of databases (v3.5-3.7).

A molecular dynamics engine was implemented into DOCK v6 by David A. Case's Group in the scoring function AMBER score. This ability accounts for receptor flexibility and allows for rank ordering by energetic ensembles in the docking calculations.

== See also ==
- AutoDock
- Molecular modelling
- Comparison of software for molecular mechanics modeling
