= Vernalis plc =

UK-based pharmaceuticals business

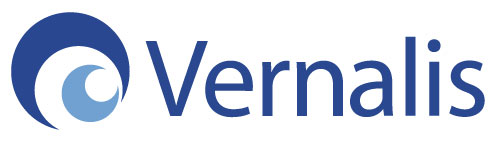
- Company type: Public
- Industry: Pharmaceuticals
- Predecessor: British Biotech, Vernalis Group
- Founded: 2003
- Defunct: 2018
- Fate: Acquired
- Successor: Vernalis Research
- Headquarters: Winnersh, UK
- Key people: Chairman: Peter Fellner (2003-2018), CEO Simon J. Sturge (2003-2008), Ian R. Garland (2008-2018)

Vernalis plc was a UK-based pharmaceuticals business headquartered in Winnersh, with research in Cambridge, and with a Berwyn, PA, US-based commercial operation, Vernalis Therapeutics Inc., focusing on the sales and marketing of slow-release formulations of prescription cough and cold medicines. Tuzistra XR (codeine polistirex/ chlorpheniramine polistirex) was the first launched product which arose from this strategy, however sales did not reach expectations. As a result, the strategy was abandoned and the company was put up for sale. Vernalis plc was listed on AIM until its acquisition by Ligand Holdings (UK) Ltd, a subsidiary of Ligand Pharmaceuticals, Inc. (NASDAQ:LGND) on 10 October 2018.

Vernalis plc (formerly known as British Biotech plc prior to 1 October 2003), arose from two company mergers. The first merger, with the privately held Cambridge-based RiboTargets Holdings plc, was completed in April 2003, and brought a structure-based drug discovery capability focused on novel cancer targets. The second merger, with Vernalis Group, was completed in September 2003 and brought a marketed product, frovatriptan, a clinical portfolio and drug discovery programmes focused on CNS disorders.

Its successful Cambridge, UK-based research facility, with expertise in fragment and structure-based drug discovery, continues as Vernalis Research. The company is engaged in research collaborations with pharmaceuticals industry partners, and maintains a pipeline of commercially partnered and non-partnered drug candidates in pre-clinical and clinical development.
