= AutoDock =

Suite of automated protein docking tools

AutoDock and AutoDock Vina
- Developer: Scripps Research
- Release: 1989; 37 years ago
- Stable release: 4.2.6 (AutoDock), 1.2.0 (AutoDock Vina) / 2014; 12 years ago (AutoDock), 2021; 5 years ago (AutoDock Vina)
- Written in: C++, C
- Operating system: Linux, Mac OS X, SGI IRIX, and Microsoft Windows
- Platform: Many
- Available in: English
- Type: Protein–ligand docking
- License: GPL (AutoDock), Apache License (AutoDock Vina)
- Website: autodock.scripps.edu (AutoDock) vina.scripps.edu (AutoDock Vina)

AutoDock is a molecular modeling simulation software. It is especially effective for protein-ligand docking. AutoDock 4 is available under the GNU General Public License. AutoDock is one of the most cited docking software applications in the research community. It is used by the FightAIDS@Home and OpenPandemics - COVID-19 projects run at World Community Grid, to search for antivirals against HIV/AIDS and COVID-19. In February 2007, a search of the ISI Citation Index showed more than 1,100 publications had been cited using the primary AutoDock method papers. As of 2009, this number surpassed 1,200.

AutoDock Vina is a successor of AutoDock, significantly improved in terms of accuracy and performance. It is available under the Apache license.

Both AutoDock and Vina are currently maintained by Scripps Research, specifically the Center for Computational Structural Biology (CCSB) led by Dr. Arthur J. Olson.

AutoDock is widely used and played a role in the development of the first clinically approved HIV-1 integrase inhibitor by Merck & Co.

== Programs ==
AutoDock consists of two main programs:

- AutoDock for docking of the ligand to a set of grids describing the target protein;
- AutoGrid for pre-calculating these grids.

Usage of AutoDock has contributed to the discovery of several drugs, including HIV1 integrase inhibitors.

== Platform support ==
AutoDock runs on Linux, Mac OS X, SGI IRIX, and Microsoft Windows. It is available as a package in several Linux distributions, including Debian, Fedora, and Arch Linux.

Compiling the application in native 64-bit mode on Microsoft Windows enables faster floating-point operation of the software.

== Improved versions ==
=== AutoDock for GPUs ===
Improved calculation routines using OpenCL and CUDA have been developed by the AutoDock Scripps research team.

It results in observed speedups of up to 4x (quad-core CPU) and 56x (GPU) over the original serial AutoDock 4.2 (Solis-Wets) on CPU.

The CUDA version was developed in a collaboration between the Scripps research team and Nvidia while the OpenCL version was further optimized with support from the IBM World Community Grid team.

=== AutoDock Vina ===
AutoDock has a successor, AutoDock Vina, which has an improved local search routine and makes use of multicore/multi-CPU computer setups.

AutoDock Vina has been noted for running significantly faster under 64-bit Linux operating systems in several World Community Grid projects that used the software.

AutoDock Vina is currently on version 1.2, released in July 2021.

=== Third-party improvements and tools ===
As an open source project, AutoDock has gained several third-party improved versions such as:

- Scoring and Minimization with AutoDock Vina (smina) is a fork of AutoDock Vina with improved support for scoring function development and energy minimization.
- Off-Target Pipeline allows integration of AutoDock within bigger projects.
- Consensus Scoring ToolKit provides rescoring of AutoDock Vina poses with multiple scoring functions and calibration of consensus scoring equations.
- VSLAB is a VMD plug-in that allows the use of AutoDock directly from VMD.
- PyRx provides a nice GUI for running virtual screening with AutoDock. PyRx includes a docking wizard and you can use it to run AutoDock Vina in the Cloud or HPC cluster.
- POAP is a shell-script-based tool which automates AutoDock for virtual screening from ligand preparation to post docking analysis.
- VirtualFlow allows to carry out ultra-large virtual screenings on computer clusters and the cloud using AutoDock Vina-based docking programs, allowing to routinely screen billions of compounds.

=== FPGA acceleration ===
Using general programmable chips as co-processors, specifically the OMIXON experimental product, speedup was within the range 10x-100x the speed of standard Intel Dual Core 2 GHz CPU.

== See also ==
- Docking (molecular)
- Virtual screening
- List of protein-ligand docking software
