= Vernalis Group =

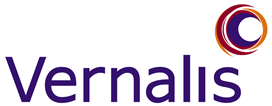
- Company type: Public
- Industry: Pharmaceuticals
- Predecessor: Vanguard Medica, Cerebrus
- Founded: 1991
- Defunct: 2003
- Fate: Acquired
- Successor: Vernalis plc
- Headquarters: Winnersh, UK
- Key people: CEO Robert G. Mansfield

Vernalis Group was a British-based pharmaceuticals business headquartered in Winnersh. The Vernalis name comes from the verb “to vernalise”, meaning nurture or develop, and is derived from the Latin word vernus, meaning "of the spring".

Vernalis Group was originally known as Vanguard Medica, which was founded in 1991 and based in Guildford. Its virtualised business model involved inlicensing of compounds in pre-clinical development from pharmaceuticals companies, running clinical trials through the use of contract research organisations and sharing in downstream royalties when drugs reached the market.

In 1994, Vanguard Medica entered into a deal with SmithKline Beecham to develop SB 209509, its oral selective 5HT1D receptor agonist for the treatment of migraine, later known as VML251 and frovatriptan.

Vanguard Medica acquired privately held Cerebrus in 1999, which specialised in discovering and developing therapeutics for disorders of the central nervous system.

Vanguard Medica was renamed Vernalis Group in 2000, with Vernalis Research Limited and Vernalis Development Limited conducting its R&D efforts from its Winnersh facility.

Vernalis Group was acquired in 2003 by British Biotech, when Peter Fellner, the former CEO of Celltech, reversed the company into Vernalis Group. The combined group, Vernalis plc, with Peter Fellner as Chairman and Simon Sturge, the former CEO of privately held RiboTargets Holdings plc, as CEO, had a drug on the market, frovatriptan, and a drug discovery pipeline enhanced by its acquisition of RiboTargets.
