= Interactor =

An interactor is an entity that natural selection acts upon.

== Definition ==
Interactor is a concept commonly used in the field of evolutionary biology. A widely accepted theory of evolution is the theory from Charles Darwin. He states, in short, that in a population there is often variation in heritable traits among individuals, in which a form of the trait might be more beneficial than the other form(s). Due to this difference, the chance of getting more adjusted offspring to the environment is higher. The process describing the selection of the environment on the traits of organisms is called natural selection. Based on this idea natural selection seems to act on traits of individuals, which evolutionary biologist like to call the interactor. So stated in a different way; an interactor is defined as a part of an organism that natural selection acts upon.

== Replicators and vehicles ==
=== Replicators ===
Other terms that are often mentioned in the same context as interactors, are replicators and vehicles. When replicators are mentioned, they mean things that pass on their entire structure through successive replications, like genes. This is not the same as an interactor, as interactors are things that interact with their environment and natural selection can act upon. Due to this interaction with the environment, interactors cause differential replication. However, some things (for example genes) can be both replicators and interactors.

=== Vehicles ===
Vehicles are often used as a synonym of interactors, only in a way that vehicles can "drive" natural selection, as if they have the behaviour to steer natural selection in a specific way. The term "vehicle" makes it look that way and therefore some people (like Hull) prefer the word "interactor" to "vehicle" for the same concept. An example of an interactor is the shell colour of snails (see below).

== Research on common garden snails as illustration for natural selection and interactors ==
A study on common garden snails was performed and showed how natural selection on an interactor works. This species is highly suitable for evolutionary research due to their easily to score phenotype and their very straightforward genotype causing the phenotypic variation. Phenotypic variation among common garden snails can be found in their shell colour and banding and both colouring and banding is regulated by one single gene. The snail shells have variations in colours namely brown, pink and yellow; with brown being more dominant than pink and yellow. Furthermore, banding variation can be described as unbanded and banded, with banded individuals differing from another by the number of bands. One of the conclusions that could be drawn out of this research is that in grasslands, yellow individuals had a higher survival rate and were more abundant in these grasslands. This means that natural selection acted on the shell colour, which means that shell colour is the interactor in this example. Furthermore, they found that the brown individuals were more abundant and had a higher survival rate in woodlands than the yellow individuals. Moreover, a specific form of natural selection called thermal selection showed that shell colour worked in the interaction with the environment by yellow shells being more abundant, so more adjusted to reflect heat, in warmer places.
