= Lead Finder =

Computational chemistry application

Lead Finder is a computational chemistry tool designed for modelling protein-ligand interactions. It is used for conducting molecular docking studies and quantitatively assessing ligand binding and biological activity. It offers free access to users in commercial, academic, or other settings.

== About ==
The original docking algorithm integrated into Lead Finder can be tailored for either quick but less accurate virtual screening applications or slower but more in-depth analyses.

Lead Finder is used by computational and medicinal chemists for drug discovery, as well as pharmacologists and toxicologists involved in in silico assessment of ADME-Tox properties. Additionally, it is used by biochemists and enzymologists working on modelling protein-ligand interactions, enzyme specificity, and rational enzyme design. Lead Finder's specialization in ligand docking and binding energy estimation is a result of its advanced docking algorithm and the precision with which it represents protein-ligand interactions.

== Docking algorithm ==
From a mathematical perspective, ligand docking involves modelling a multidimensional surface that describes the free energy associated with protein-ligand binding. This surface can be highly complex, with ligands possessing as many as 15-20 degrees of freedom, such as freely rotatable bonds.

Lead Finder's approach combines genetic algorithm search, local optimization techniques, and knowledge gathered during the search process.

== Scoring function ==
The Lead Finder scoring function represents protein-ligand interactions more precisely. The scoring function's model considers various types of molecular interactions.

In this scoring function, individual energy contributions are carefully adjusted with empirically derived coefficients tailored to objectives. Such as the prediction of binding energies, the ranking of energy for docked ligand poses, and the ordering of active and inactive compounds during virtual screening experiments. To achieve these goals, Lead Finder employs three types of scoring functions, based on the same set of energy contributions but with different sets of energy-scaling coefficients.

== Docking success rate ==
Docking success rate was benchmarked as a percentage of correctly docked ligands for a set of protein-ligand complexes extracted from PDB. Results showed root mean squared deviations of 2 Å or less for 80-96% of the structures in the respective test sets (FlexX, Glide SP, Glide XP, Gold, LigandFit, MolDock, Surflex).
