= Scoring functions for docking =

Mathematical functions in chemistry

Docking glossary

Receptor or host or lock
The "receiving" molecule, most commonly a protein or other biopolymer.
Ligand or guest or key
The complementary partner molecule which binds to the receptor. Ligands are most often small molecules but could also be another biopolymer.
Docking
Computational simulation of a candidate ligand binding to a receptor.
Binding mode
The orientation of the ligand relative to the receptor as well as the conformation of the ligand and receptor when bound to each other.
Pose
A candidate binding mode.
Scoring
The process of evaluating a particular pose by counting the number of favorable intermolecular interactions such as hydrogen bonds and hydrophobic contacts.
Ranking
The process of classifying which ligands are most likely to interact favorably to a particular receptor based on the predicted free-energy of binding.
Docking assessment (DA)
Procedure to quantify the predictive capability of a docking protocol.

In the fields of computational chemistry and molecular modelling, scoring functions are mathematical functions used to approximately predict the binding affinity between two molecules after they have been docked. Most commonly one of the molecules is a small organic compound such as a drug and the second is the drug's biological target such as a protein receptor. Scoring functions have also been developed to predict the strength of intermolecular interactions between two proteins or between protein and DNA.

Most scoring functions estimate some quantity related to change in Gibbs free energy in kcal/mol, so more negative scores indicate better docking, but not all scoring functions have their zero at $\Delta G=0$, so the sign of the score is not necessarily meaningful.

== Utility ==
Scoring functions are widely used in drug discovery and other molecular modelling applications. These include:

- Virtual screening of small molecule databases of candidate ligands to identify novel small molecules that bind to a protein target of interest and therefore are useful starting points for drug discovery
- De novo design (design "from scratch") of novel small molecules that bind to a protein target
- Lead optimization of screening hits to optimize their affinity and selectivity

A potentially more reliable but much more computationally demanding alternative to scoring functions are free energy perturbation calculations.

== Prerequisites ==
Scoring functions are normally parameterized (or trained) against a data set consisting of experimentally determined binding affinities between molecular species similar to the species that one wishes to predict.

For currently used methods aiming to predict affinities of ligands for proteins the following must first be known or predicted:

- Protein tertiary structure – arrangement of the protein atoms in three-dimensional space. Protein structures may be determined by experimental techniques such as X-ray crystallography or solution phase NMR methods or predicted by homology modelling.
- Ligand active conformation – three-dimensional shape of the ligand when bound to the protein
- Binding-mode – orientation of the two binding partners relative to each other in the complex

The above information yields the three-dimensional structure of the complex. Based on this structure, the scoring function can then estimate the strength of the association between the two molecules in the complex using one of the methods outlined below. Finally the scoring function itself may be used to help predict both the binding mode and the active conformation of the small molecule in the complex, or alternatively a simpler and computationally faster function may be utilized within the docking run.

== Classes ==
There are four general classes of scoring functions:

- Force field – affinities are estimated by summing the strength of intermolecular van der Waals and electrostatic interactions between all atoms of the two molecules in the complex using a force field. The intramolecular energies (also referred to as strain energy) of the two binding partners are also frequently included. Finally since the binding normally takes place in the presence of water, the desolvation energies of the ligand and of the protein are sometimes taken into account using implicit solvation methods such as GBSA or PBSA.
- Empirical – based on counting the number of various types of interactions between the two binding partners. Counting may be based on the number of ligand and receptor atoms in contact with each other or by calculating the change in solvent accessible surface area (ΔSASA) in the complex compared to the uncomplexed ligand and protein. The coefficients of the scoring function are usually fit using multiple linear regression methods. These interactions terms of the function may include for example:
  - hydrophobic — hydrophobic contacts (favorable),
  - hydrophobic — hydrophilic contacts (unfavorable) (Accounts for unmet hydrogen bonds, which are an important enthalpic contribution to binding. One lost hydrogen bond can account for 1–2 orders of magnitude in binding affinity.),
  - number of hydrogen bonds (favorable contribution to affinity, especially if shielded from solvent, if solvent exposed no contribution),
  - number of rotatable bonds immobilized in complex formation (unfavorable conformational entropy contribution).
- Knowledge-based – based on statistical observations of intermolecular close contacts in large 3D databases (such as the Cambridge Structural Database or Protein Data Bank) which are used to derive statistical "potentials of mean force". This method is founded on the assumption that close intermolecular interactions between certain types of atoms or functional groups that occur more frequently than one would expect by a random distribution are likely to be energetically favorable and therefore contribute favorably to binding affinity.
- Machine-learning – Unlike these classical scoring functions, machine-learning scoring functions are characterized by not assuming a predetermined functional form for the relationship between binding affinity and the structural features describing the protein-ligand complex. In this way, the functional form is inferred directly from the data. Machine-learning scoring functions have consistently been found to outperform classical scoring functions at binding affinity prediction of diverse protein-ligand complexes. This has also been the case for target-specific complexes, although the advantage is target-dependent and mainly depends on the volume of relevant data available. When appropriate care is taken, machine-learning scoring functions tend to strongly outperform classical scoring functions at the related problem of structure-based virtual screening. Furthermore, if data specific for the target is available, this performance gap widens These reviews provide a broader overview on machine-learning scoring functions for structure-based drug design. The choice of decoys for a given target is one of the most important factors for training and testing any scoring function.

The first three types, force-field, empirical and knowledge-based, are commonly referred to as classical scoring functions and are characterized by assuming their contributions to binding are linearly combined. Due to this constraint, classical scoring functions are unable to take advantage of large amounts of training data.

== Refinement ==
Since different scoring functions are relatively co-linear, consensus scoring functions may not improve accuracy significantly. This claim went somewhat against the prevailing view in the field, since previous studies had suggested that consensus scoring was beneficial.

A perfect scoring function would be able to predict the binding free energy between the ligand and its target. But in reality both the computational methods and the computational resources put restraints to this goal. So most often methods are selected that minimize the number of false positive and false negative ligands. In cases where an experimental training set of data of binding constants and structures are available a simple method has been developed to refine the scoring function used in molecular docking.
