= Vernalis Research =

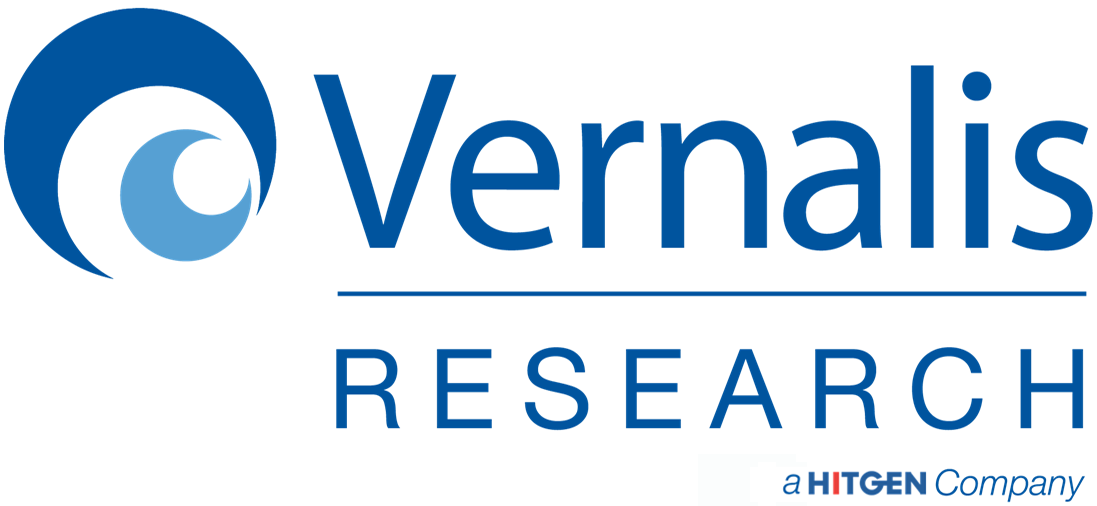
- Type: Subsidiary
- Industry: Pharmaceutical and Biotechnology
- Predecessor: Vernalis plc
- Founded: 2018
- Headquarters: Cambridge, United Kingdom
- Key people: Clare Searle (Finance Director); James Murray (Research Director)
- Products: Pharmaceuticals
- Owner: Vernalis (R&D) Limited
- Number of employees: 75
- Parent: HitGen
- Website: vernalis.com

Vernalis Research develops and applies fragment and structure-based methods to drug discovery, and has generated cell active lead compounds and development candidates against biological targets in oncology, neurodegeneration, anti-infectives and inflammation.

== History ==
Following the sale of Vernalis plc on 10 October 2018, Vernalis Research became a subsidiary of Ligand Holdings UK Ltd, wholly owned by Ligand Pharmaceuticals, Inc. On 2 December 2020, HitGen (Chengdu, China), acquired the entire issued share capital of Vernalis (R&D) Limited.

Their scientists, based at Granta Park, Cambridge UK, integrate fragment-based approaches, structural biology, biophysics, assay technology, drug metabolism, pharmacokinetics, cheminformatics, molecular modelling and computational, synthetic organic and medicinal chemistry to enable drug discovery on both established and novel targets, progressing projects from target identification through to clinical candidate. They have generated lead compounds on enzymes, protein-protein interactions and GPCRs, leading to clinical candidates for targets such as Chk1, Hsp90, Bcl-2, Mcl-1, FAAH and A_{2A}.

As well as an internal portfolio of drug discovery projects, Vernalis Research has a number of research collaborations on targets with large pharmaceutical companies and academic partners. Recently disclosed collaborations include those with Servier, Daiichi Sankyo, Lundbeck and Asahi Kasei Pharma. In 2014, the company was awarded a Queen's Award for Enterprise, for outstanding achievement in International Trade, endorsing both the talent and capabilities of its research group, and recognition of the growing overseas earnings it has achieved.

Vernalis Research has delivered a number of drug candidates into clinical development, some of which remained as part of the Ligand Pharmaceuticals, Inc. portfolio following the sale of the research business to HitGen. These include V158866, the lead molecule arising from an in-house FAAH research programme, which completed a phase II study in spinal cord injury patients in July 2015. Additionally, luminespib (AUY922) is a novel intravenous Hsp90 inhibitor with the potential to target a range of cancers, which arose from a research collaboration starting in 2004, originally between Vernalis plc, the Institute of Cancer Research and Cancer Research Technology, and then with Novartis. A further example is V158411, the lead intravenous molecule arising from an in-house structure-based Chk1 oncology research programme.
